= Socket 3 =

Series of CPU sockets

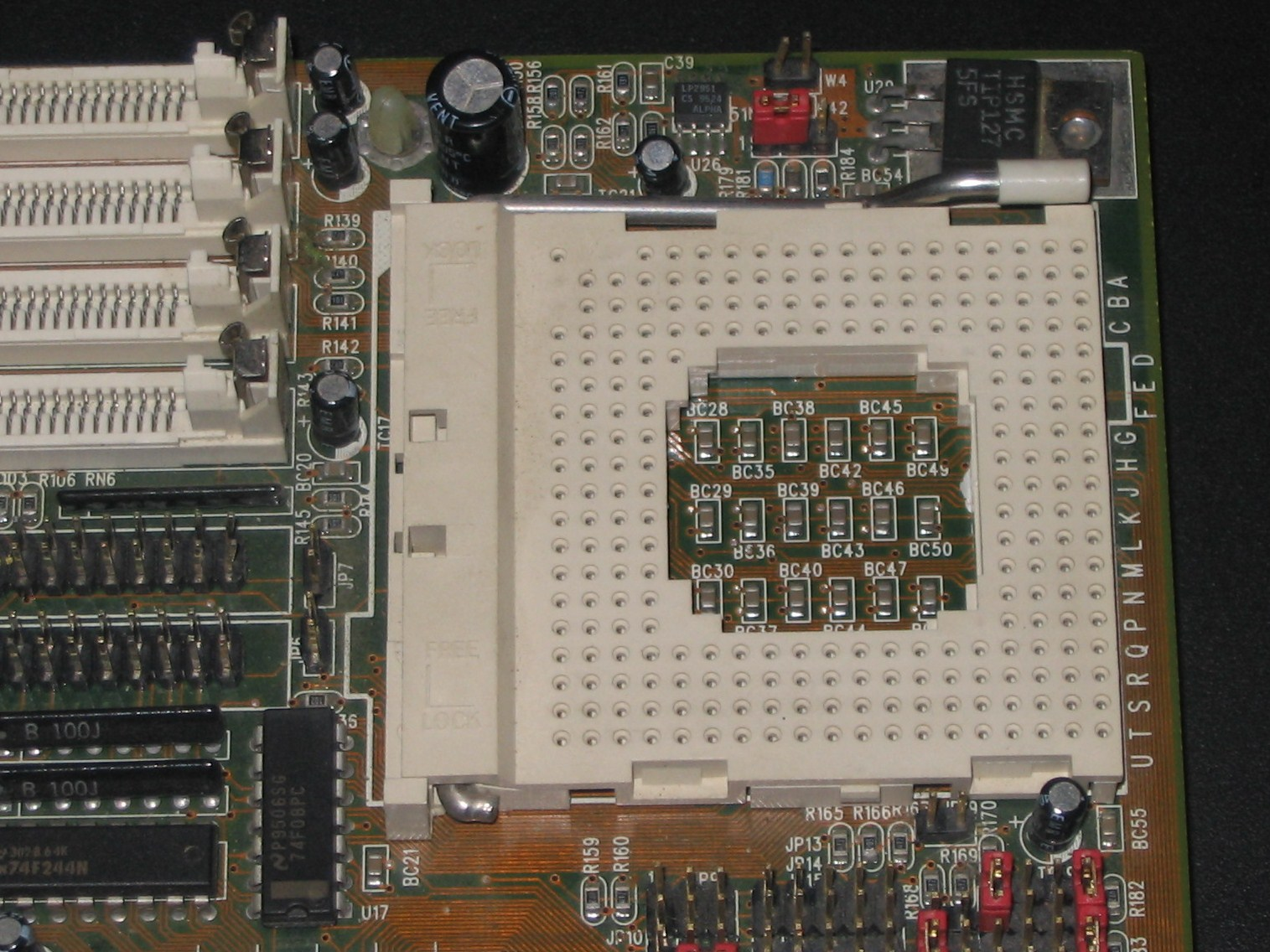
- Type: ZIF
- Chip form factors: PPGA
- Contacts: 237
- FSB protocol: ?
- FSB frequency: 25–50 MT/s
- Voltage range: 3.3 V and 5 V
- Processors: Intel 486 SX, 486 DX, 486 DX2, 486 DX4, 486 OverDrive, Pentium OverDrive; AMD Am486 and Am5x86
- Predecessor: Socket 2
- Successor: Socket 4 Socket 6
- This article is part of the CPU socket series

Socket 3 was a series of CPU sockets for various x86 microprocessors. It was sometimes found alongside a secondary socket designed for a math coprocessor chip, such as the 487. Socket 3 resulted from Intel's creation of lower voltage microprocessors. An upgrade to Socket 2, it rearranged the pin layout. Socket 3 is compatible with 168-pin socket CPUs.

Socket 3 was a 237-pin zero insertion force (ZIF) 19×19 pin grid array (PGA) socket suitable for the 3.3 V and 5 V, 25–50 MHz Intel 486 SX, 486 DX, 486 DX2, 486 DX4, 486 OverDrive and Pentium OverDrive processors as well as AMD Am486, Am5x86 and Cyrix Cx5x86 processors.

== See also ==
- List of Intel microprocessors
- List of AMD microprocessors
