= Intel OverDrive =

Intel OverDrive was a trademark of Intel used in the mid-1990s to categorize their x86 upgrade chips for existing personal computer systems. It may refer to:

- i486 OverDrive, a category of Intel i486 processors
- Pentium OverDrive, a category of Intel Pentium processors
