= 5x86 =

5x86 may refer to:

- Cyrix Cx5x86, computer chip made by Cyrix
- Am5x86, 486 computer chip made by AMD

== See also ==
- x86 for a more general explanation of this line of chips
