= Am5x86 =

486 computer chip made by AMD

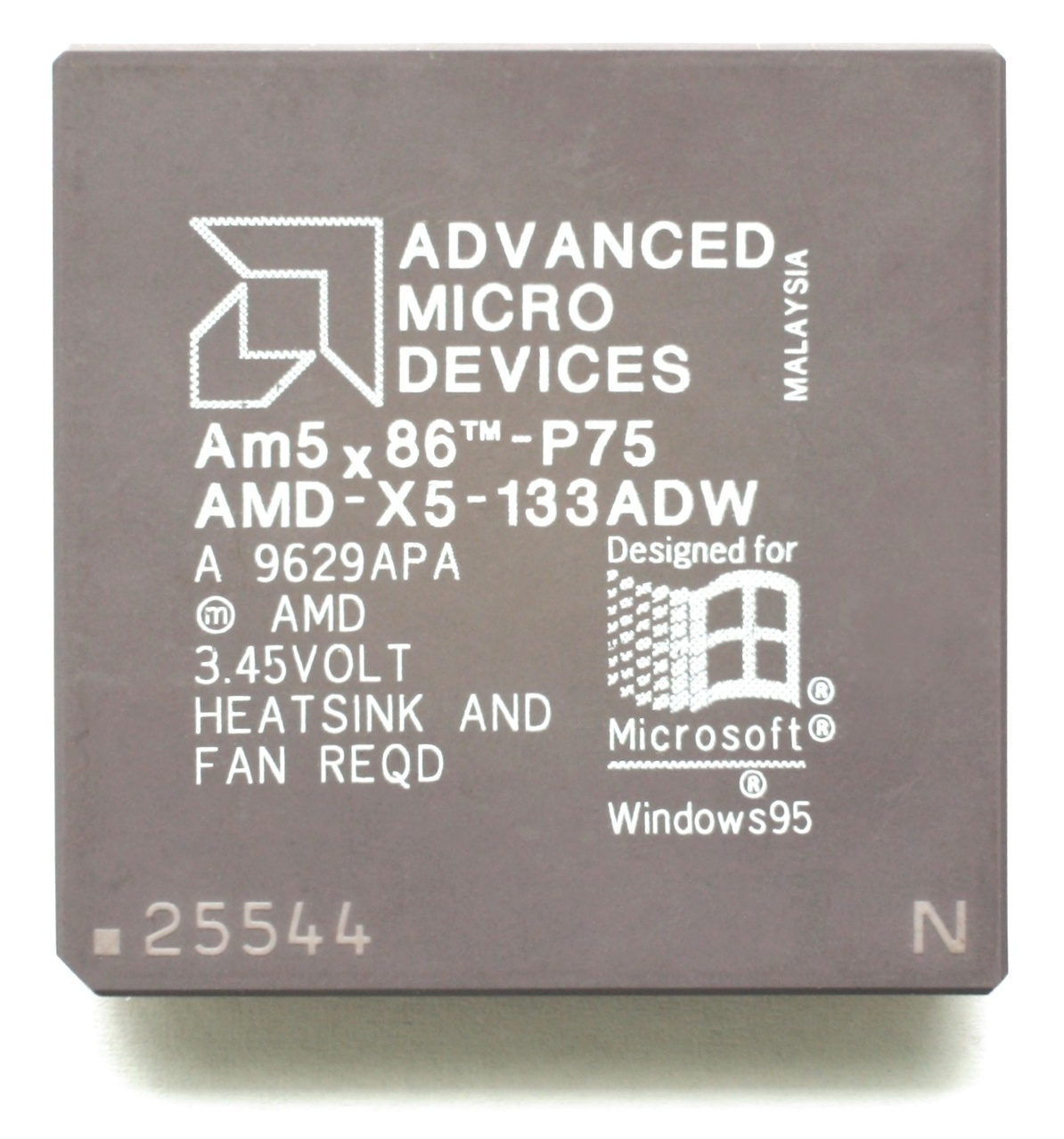
- An early Am5x86-P75 for Socket 3, model ADW

General information
- Launched: November 1995
- Discontinued: 1999
- Marketed by: AMD
- Designed by: AMD
- Common manufacturer: AMD

Performance
- Max. CPU clock rate: 133 MHz to 160 MHz
- FSB speeds: 33 MHz to 50 MHz

Physical specifications
- Cores: 1
- Packages: 168-pin PGA; 208-pin SQFP
- Sockets: Socket 1 (with voltage regulator); Socket 2 (with voltage regulator); Socket 3

Cache
- L1 cache: 4-way associative 16 KiB unified code and data, write-back or write-through.
- L2 cache: Motherboard dependent
- L3 cache: none

Architecture and classification
- Technology node: 0.35 μm
- Instruction set: x86 (IA-32)

History
- Predecessor: Am486
- Successor: AMD K5

The Am5x86 processor is an x86-compatible CPU announced in November 1995 by AMD for use in 486-class computer systems. It began shipping in December 1995, with a base price of $93 per unit in bulk quantities. Before being released, it was in development under the codename "X5". Despite the 5x86 name, it is a 486 CPU, and does not implement 586 or Pentium instructions such as cmpxchg8b. It competed primarily with the Pentium OverDrive, which is a true 586 CPU with all 586 instructions.

== Specifications ==
The Am5x86 (also known as the 5x86-133, Am5x86, X5-133, and sold under various 3rd-party labels such as the Kingston Technology "Turbochip") is an Enhanced Am486 processor with an internally set multiplier of 4, allowing it to run at 133 MHz on systems without official support for clock-multiplied DX2 or DX4 486 processors. Like all Enhanced Am486, the Am5x86 featured write-back L1 cache, and unlike all but a few, a generous 16 kilobytes rather than the more common 8 KB. A rare 150 MHz-rated OEM part was also released by AMD.

Since having a clock multiplier of four is not part of the original Socket 3 design (and that the 486 only have a single CLKMUL pin anyway), AMD made the 5x86 accept a 2x setting from the motherboard and instead operate at a rate of 4x. When using an Am5x86, the motherboard must be set to the 2x setting. The chip will physically fit into an older 486 socket such as a socket 1 or 2 or the original 168-pin 80486 socket, but doing this requires a replacement voltage regulator, since the AMD chip runs at 3.45 volts.

The combination of clock speed and the relatively large 16 KB write-back L1 cache allows the 5x86 to equal or slightly exceed an Intel Pentium 75 MHz processor in integer arithmetic in benchmarks. Real world performance varies, however, with later Windows operating systems and many FPU-sensitive games favoring the Pentium 75 MHz. Because it is based on a pure 486 design, it is compatible with older systems, something its slightly faster rival, the Cyrix Cx5x86, has trouble with. The CPU is commonly overclocked to 160 MHz, thereby giving performance similar to that of a Pentium 90 MHz system. There are four main versions of the socketed version of this CPU, manufactured in different locations. There is the common ADW variety, as well as the later ADY, ADZ and BGC. The later models were the preferred versions of the chip, because they were rated for higher temperatures and thus more forgiving of overclocking.

The Am5x86 made the first-ever use of the controversial PR rating. Because the 5x86 is the equal of a Pentium 75 MHz processor in benchmarks, AMD later marketed the chip as "Am5x86-P75".

Sales of the Am5x86 were an important source of revenue for AMD at a time when lengthy delays in bringing the AMD K5 to production were threatening the company's profitability.

AMD manufactured the Am5x86 processor for ordinary PC systems until 1999. It was popular for entry-level desktop systems, appeared in many different notebook models, and also sold separately as an upgrade processor for older 486 systems. Several companies made upgrade kits with an AMD 5x86 with a voltage regulator and socket converter, which allows its use on virtually every socketed 486 motherboard ever produced. Several companies also provided upgrades for older 486 notebooks by replacing soldered 486 CPUs. The chips were even used on later Acorn RiscPC "PC card" second processors. The RiscPC's OpenBus memory interface was only 32 bit, which meant that the Pentium could not be easily interfaced to it. Intel's expensive Pentium Overdrive for 486 systems is a troublesome CPU, with many compatibility issues, and so is not used. The 5x86 therefore provided the acme of RiscPC Windows performance.

The chip remained in production for a long time, as it was a popular choice for use in embedded controllers. One derivative of the 5x86 family is the core used in the AMD Élan SC520 family of SoC 00200microcontrollers marketed by AMD. This powers the original Cisco PIX 501 model.

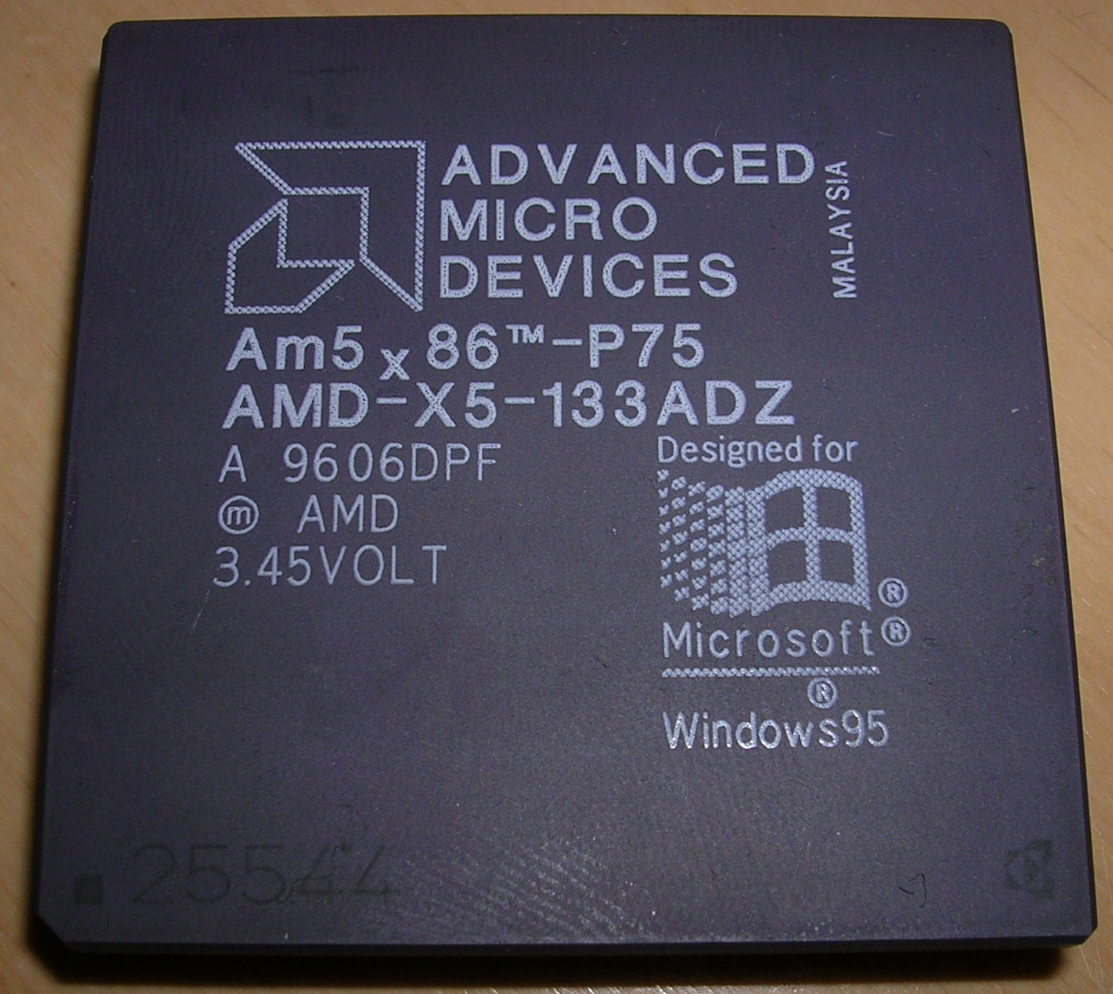
An Am5x86-P75 model ADZ

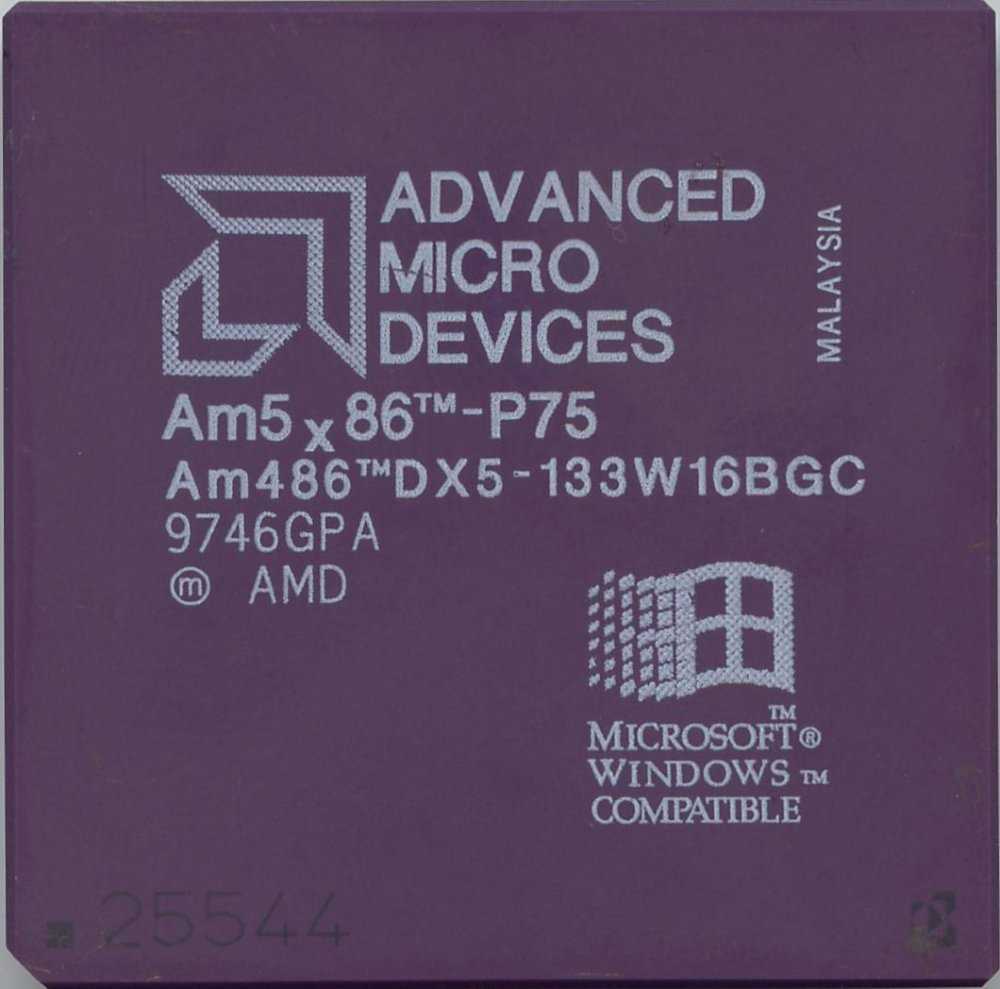
A late Am5x86-P75 for Socket 3, model W16BGC

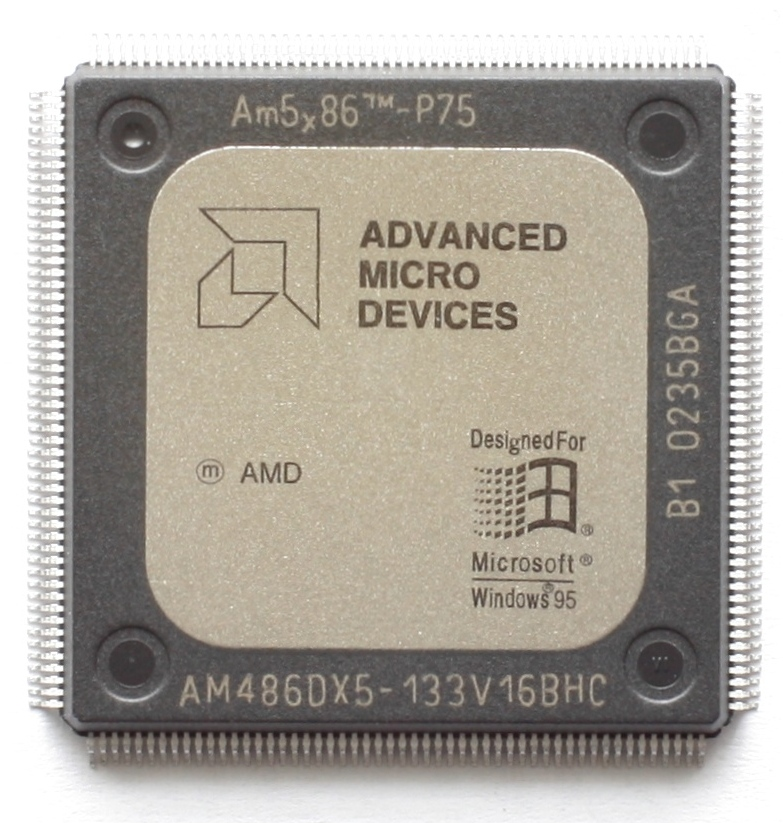
Surface-mounted Am5x86-P75, model V16BHC

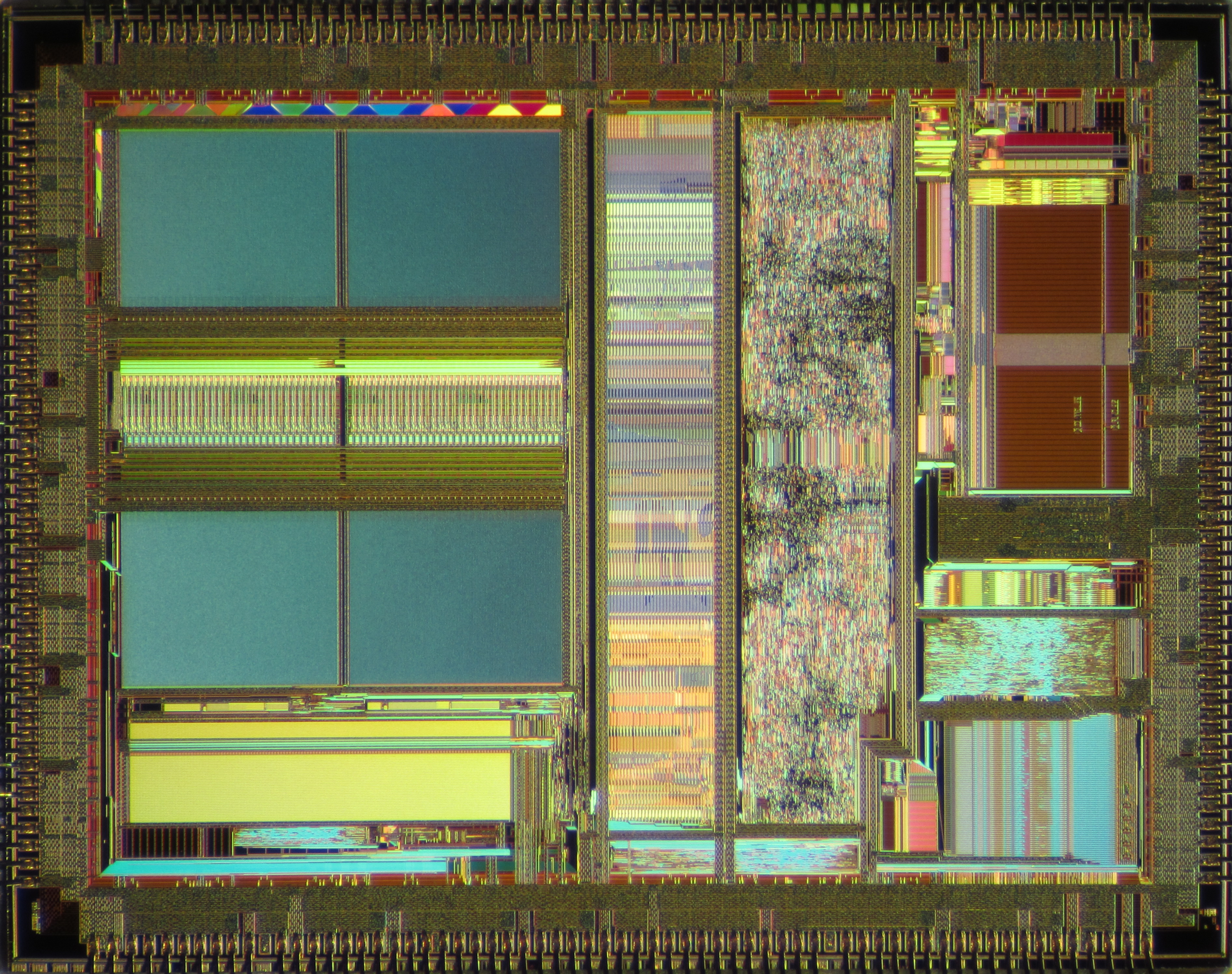
AMD Am5x86 die shot

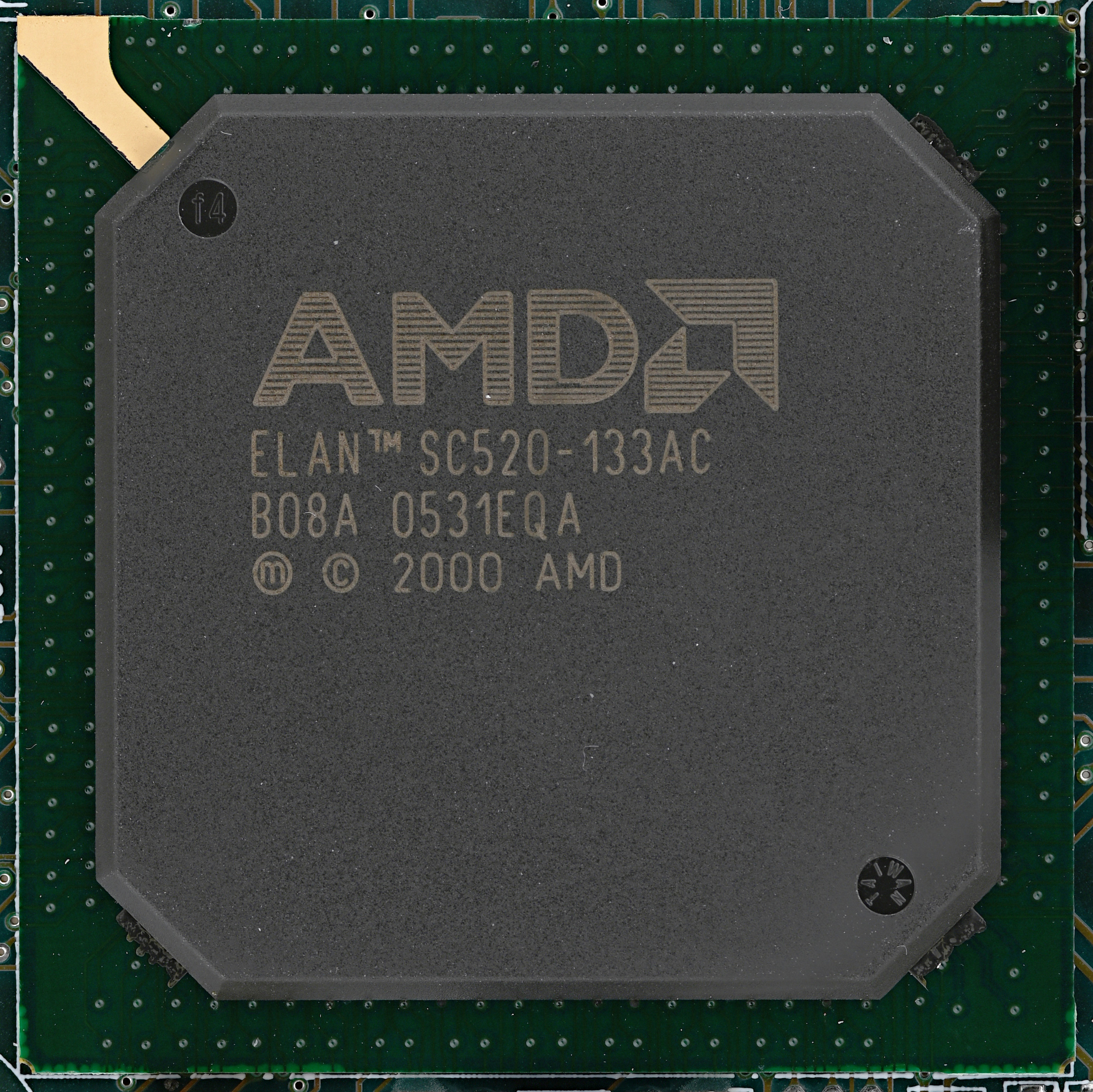
AMD Élan SC520 system on a chip based on the Am5x86 core

== Models ==
CPU	Model number	Frequency	L1 Cache	FSB	Mult.	Voltage	Package/Socket Type	Release date	Introduction price
Am5x86-P75	X5-133 ADH	133 MHz	16 KiB	33 MHz	4	3.45 V	PGA-168 Socket 1 PGA-168 Socket 2 PGA-168 Socket 3	6 November 1995	$93
Am5x86-P75	X5-133 ADY	133 MHz	16 KiB	33 MHz	4	3.45 V	PGA-168 Socket 1 PGA-168 Socket 2 PGA-168 Socket 3	6 November 1995	$93
Am5x86-P75	X5-133 ADW	133 MHz	16 KiB	33 MHz	4	3.45 V	PGA-168 Socket 1 PGA-168 Socket 2 PGA-168 Socket 3	6 November 1995	$93
Am5x86-P75	X5-133 ADZ	133 MHz	16 KiB	33 MHz	4	3.45 V	PGA-168 Socket 1 PGA-168 Socket 2 PGA-168 Socket 3	6 November 1995	$93
Am5x86-P75	X5-133 BGC	133 MHz	16 KiB	33 MHz	4	3.45 V	PGA-168 Socket 1 PGA-168 Socket 2 PGA-168 Socket 3	6 November 1995	$93
Am5x86-P75	X5-133 W16BGC	133 MHz	16 KiB	33 MHz	4	3.45 V	PGA-168 Socket 1 PGA-168 Socket 2 PGA-168 Socket 3	6 November 1995	$93
Am5x86-P75	X5-133 V16BGC	133 MHz	16 KiB	33 MHz	4	3.3 V	PGA-168 Socket 1 PGA-168 Socket 2 PGA-168 Socket 3	6 November 1995	$93
Am5x86-P75	X5-133 W16BHC	133 MHz	16 KiB	33 MHz	4	3.45 V	Surface mounted 208-pin SQFP on PGA-168	6 November 1995	$93
Am5x86-P75	X5-133 V16BHC	133 MHz	16 KiB	33 MHz	4	3.3 V	Surface mounted 208-pin SQFP on PGA-168	6 November 1995	$93
Am5x86-P75	X5-133 SFZ	133 MHz	16 KiB	33 MHz	4	3.3 V	Surface mounted 208-pin SQFP on PGA-168	6 November 1995	$93
Am5x86-P75+	X5-150 ADW	150 MHz	16 KiB	50 MHz	3	3.45 V	PGA-168 Socket 1 PGA-168 Socket 2 PGA-168 Socket 3		
Am5x86-P100	X5-160 ADZ	160 MHz	16 KiB	40 MHz	4	3.45 V	PGA-168 Socket 1 PGA-168 Socket 2 PGA-168 Socket 3		
Reference Guide

Data from
