= Socket 2 =

Microprocessor socket

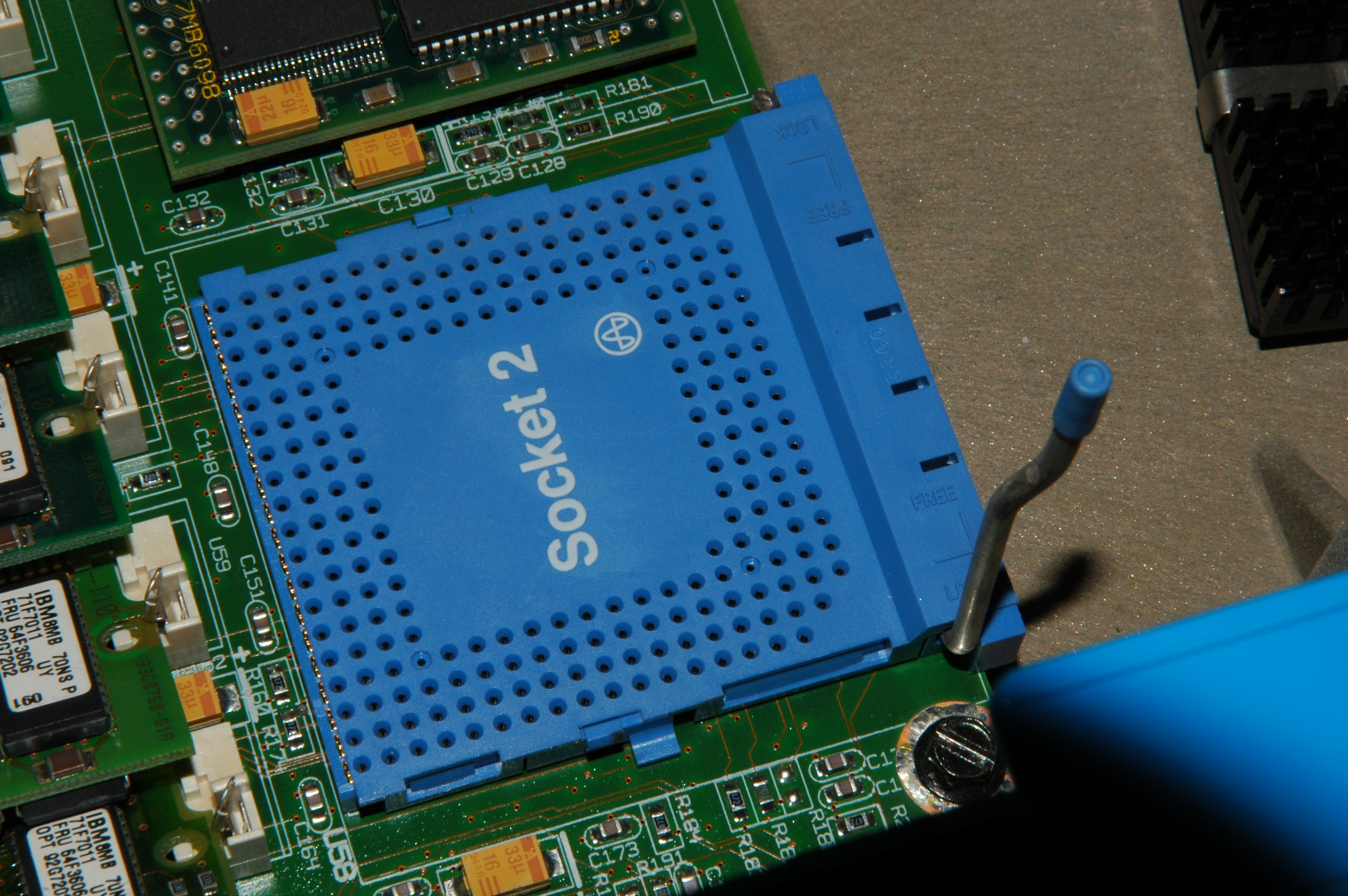
- Type: ZIF
- Chip form factors: PPGA
- Contacts: 238
- FSB protocol: ?
- FSB frequency: 25–50 MT/s
- Voltage range: 5 V
- Processors: Intel 486 SX, 486 DX, 486 DX2, 486 OverDrive, Pentium OverDrive
- Predecessor: Socket 1
- Successor: Socket 3
- This article is part of the CPU socket series

Socket 2 was one of the series of CPU sockets into which various x86 microprocessors were inserted. It was an updated Socket 1 with added support for Pentium OverDrive processors.

Socket 2 was a 238-pin zero insertion force (ZIF) 19×19 pin grid array (PGA) socket suitable for the 5-volt, 25 to 66 MHz 486 SX, 486 DX, 486 DX2, 486 OverDrive and 63 or 83 MHz Pentium OverDrive processors.

== See also ==
- List of Intel microprocessors
