= RapidCAD =

Type of microprocessor

RapidCAD is a specially packaged Intel 486DX and a dummy floating-point unit (FPU) designed as pin-compatible replacements for an Intel 80386 processor and 80387 FPU. Because the i486DX has a working on-chip FPU, a dummy FPU package (the "RapidCAD-2") is supplied to go in the Intel 387 FPU socket. The dummy FPU is used to provide the FERR (Floating-point ERRor) signal, necessary for compatibility purposes.

Despite being able to execute instructions in the same number of cycles as an i486DX, integer performance on RapidCAD suffers due to the absence of level 1 cache and the bottleneck of the 386 bus. RapidCAD offers minimal improvement in integer performance over a 386DX (typically 10%, at most 35%), but provides substantial improvement in floating-point operations (up to 80% faster) for which it was marketed, primarily for computer-aided design (hence the name). Floating-point performance is mostly improved by moving the FPU onto the CPU core. Other source reports that the performance boost ranged from 20 to 170 percent faster than the regular 386DX based motherboards. It was available at manufacturer's suggested list price of US$499.

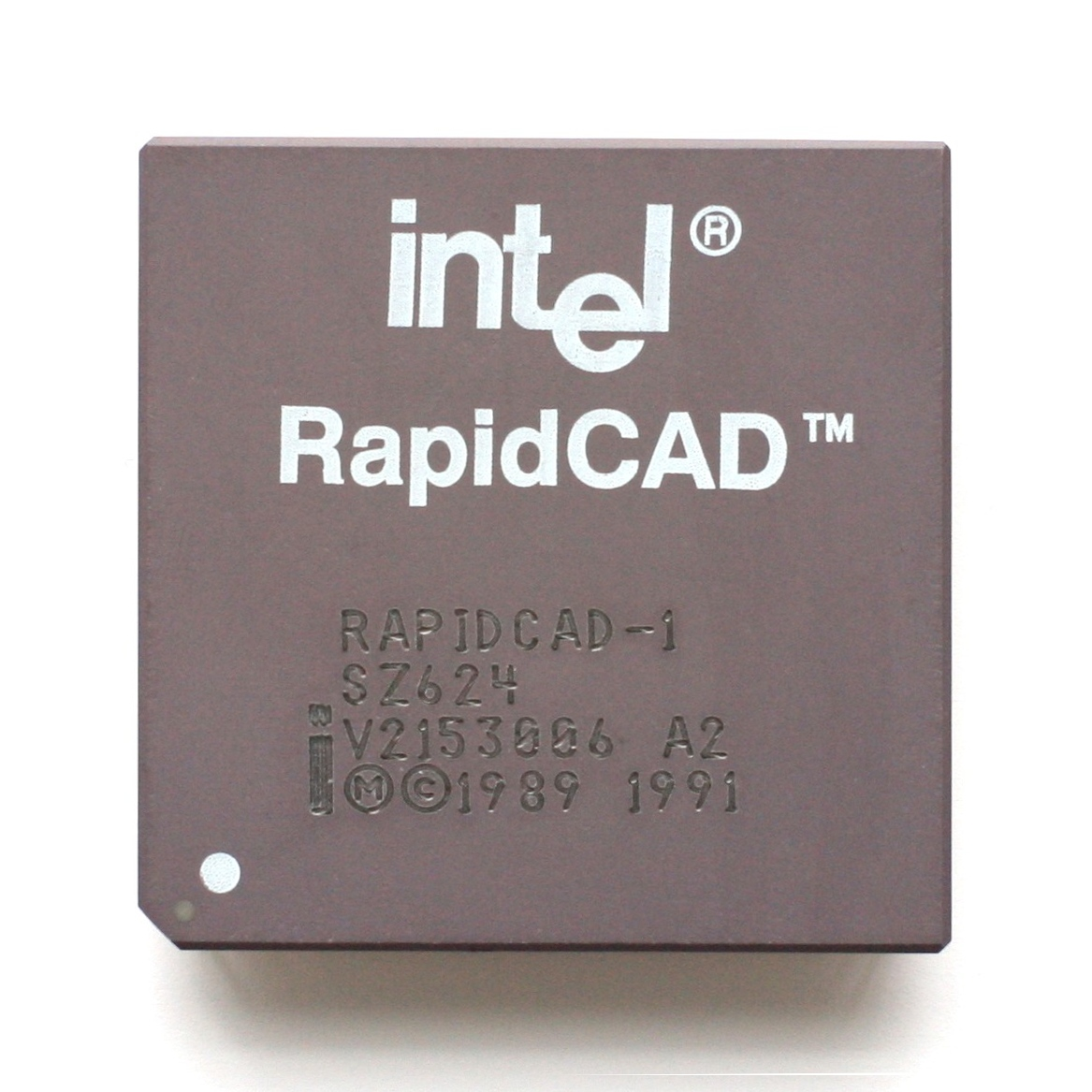
Intel RapidCAD-1

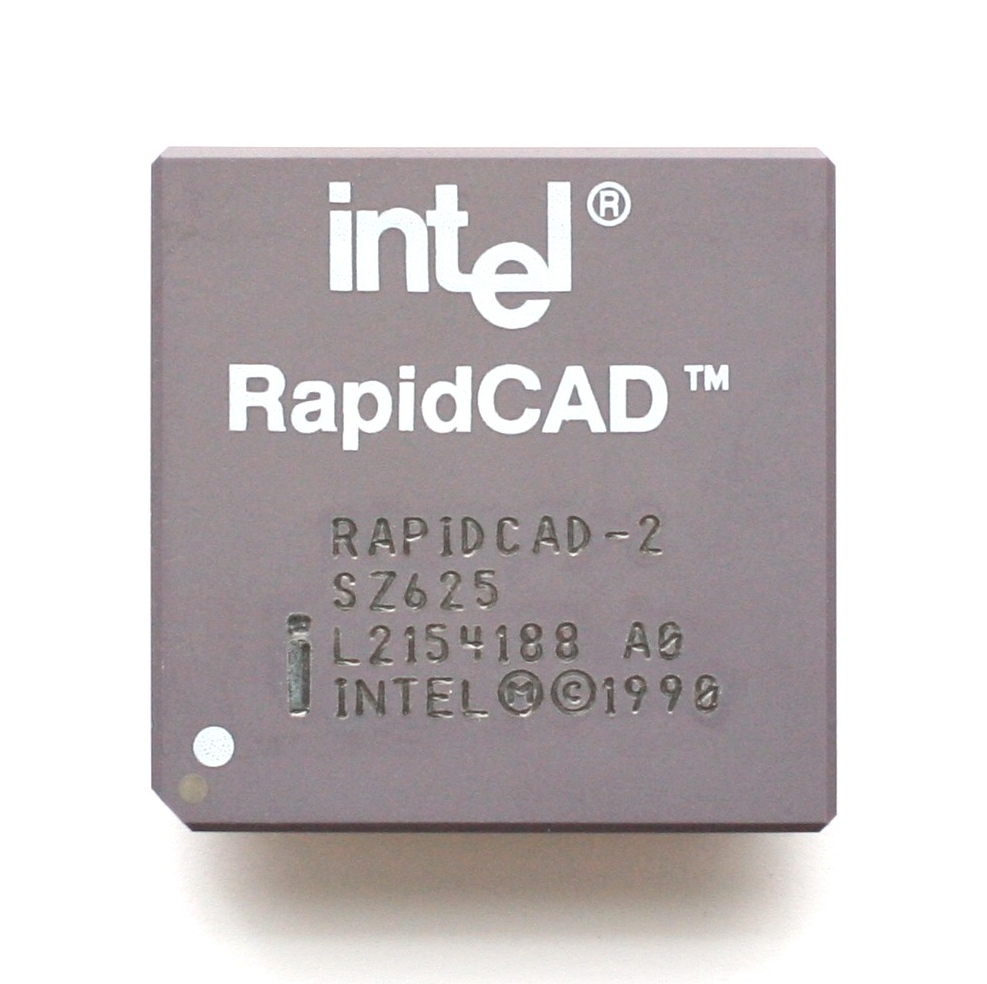
Intel RapidCAD-2

== Technical specifications ==
Intel RapidCAD-1

- Package: 132-pin CPGA
- CPU clock: 16–33 MHz
- Transistors: 800,000
- Process: CHMOS 0.8 μm
- Voltage: 5 V
- sSpec: SZ624

Intel RapidCAD-2

- Package: 68-pin CPGA
- CPU clock: 16–33 MHz
- Transistors: 275,000
- Process: CHMOS
- Voltage: 5 V
- sSpec: SZ625

== See also ==
- Intel 80486 OverDrive
- Pentium OverDrive
