= Socket 1 =

Intel CPU socket

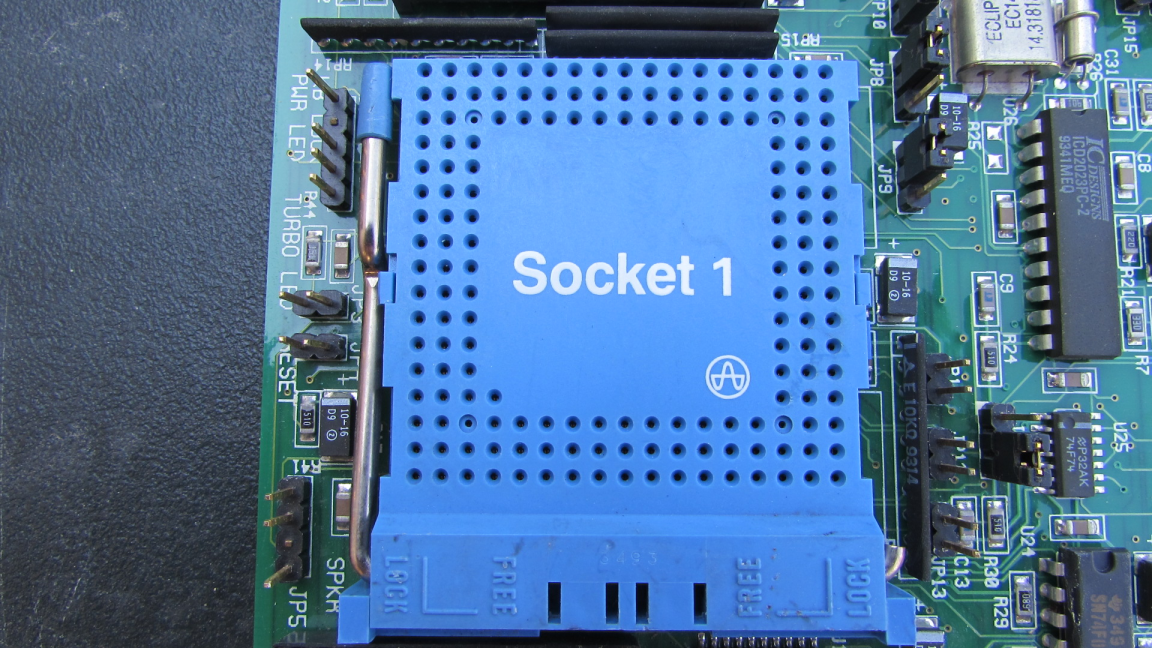
- Type: ZIF
- Chip form factors: PGA
- Contacts: 169
- FSB protocol: ?
- FSB frequency: 16–33 MT/s
- Voltage range: 5 V
- Processors: Intel 486 SX, 486 DX, 486 DX2, 486 OverDrive
- Successor: Socket 2
- This article is part of the CPU socket series

Socket 1, originally called the "OverDrive" socket, was the second of a series of standard CPU sockets created by Intel into which various x86 microprocessors were inserted. It was an upgrade to Intel's first standard 169-pin pin grid array (PGA) socket and the first with an official designation. Socket 1 was intended as a 486 upgrade socket, and added one extra pin to prevent upgrade chips from being inserted incorrectly.

Socket 1 was a 169-pin zero insertion force (ZIF) 17×17 pin grid array (PGA) socket suitable for the 5-volt, 16 to 33 MHz 486 SX, 486 DX, 486 DX2 and 486 OverDrive processors. The socket was also used originally used for the i487SX upgrade socket.

== See also ==
- List of Intel microprocessors
