= I486 OverDrive =

Family of 32-bit microprocessors

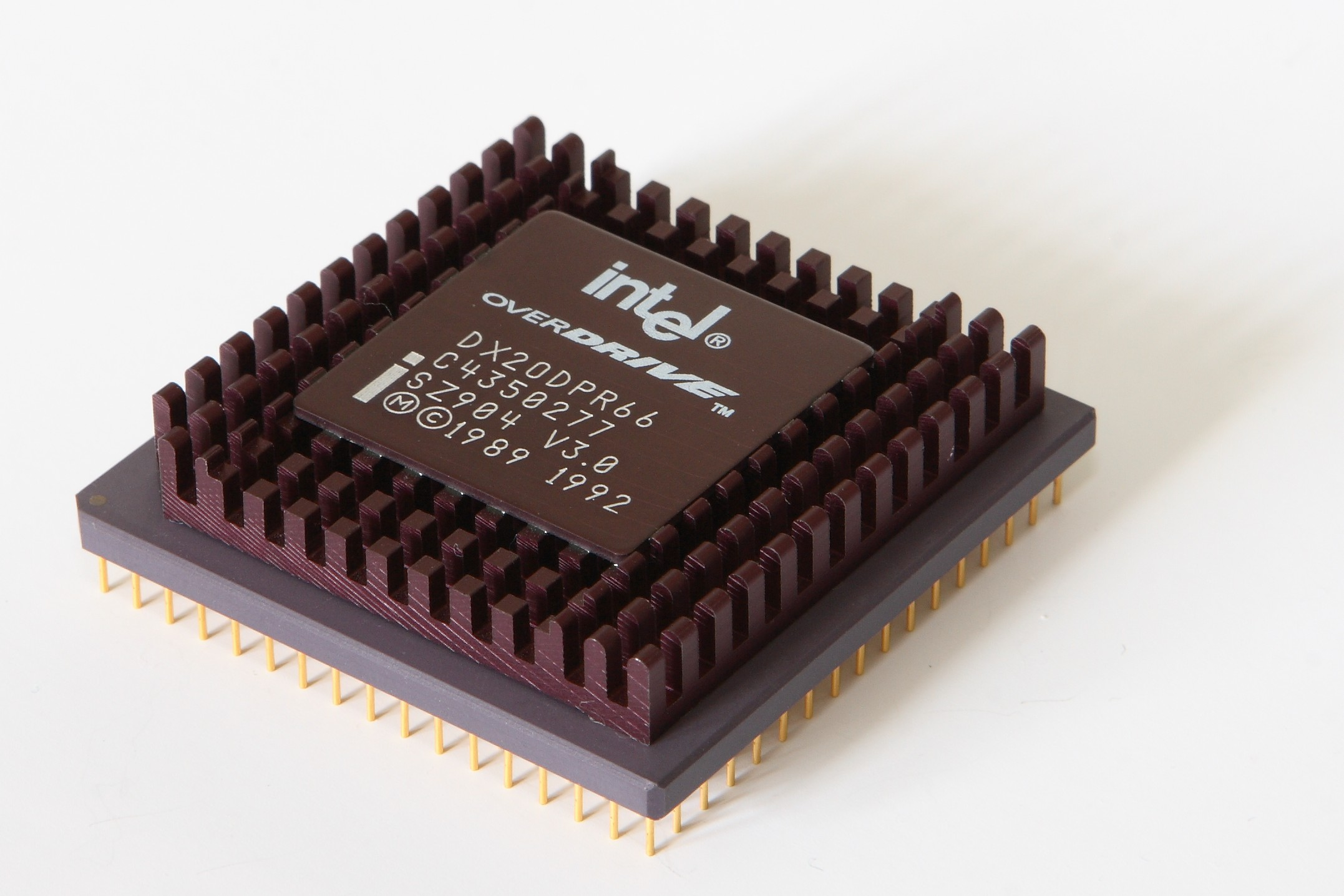
An Intel DX2-66 MHz OverDrive

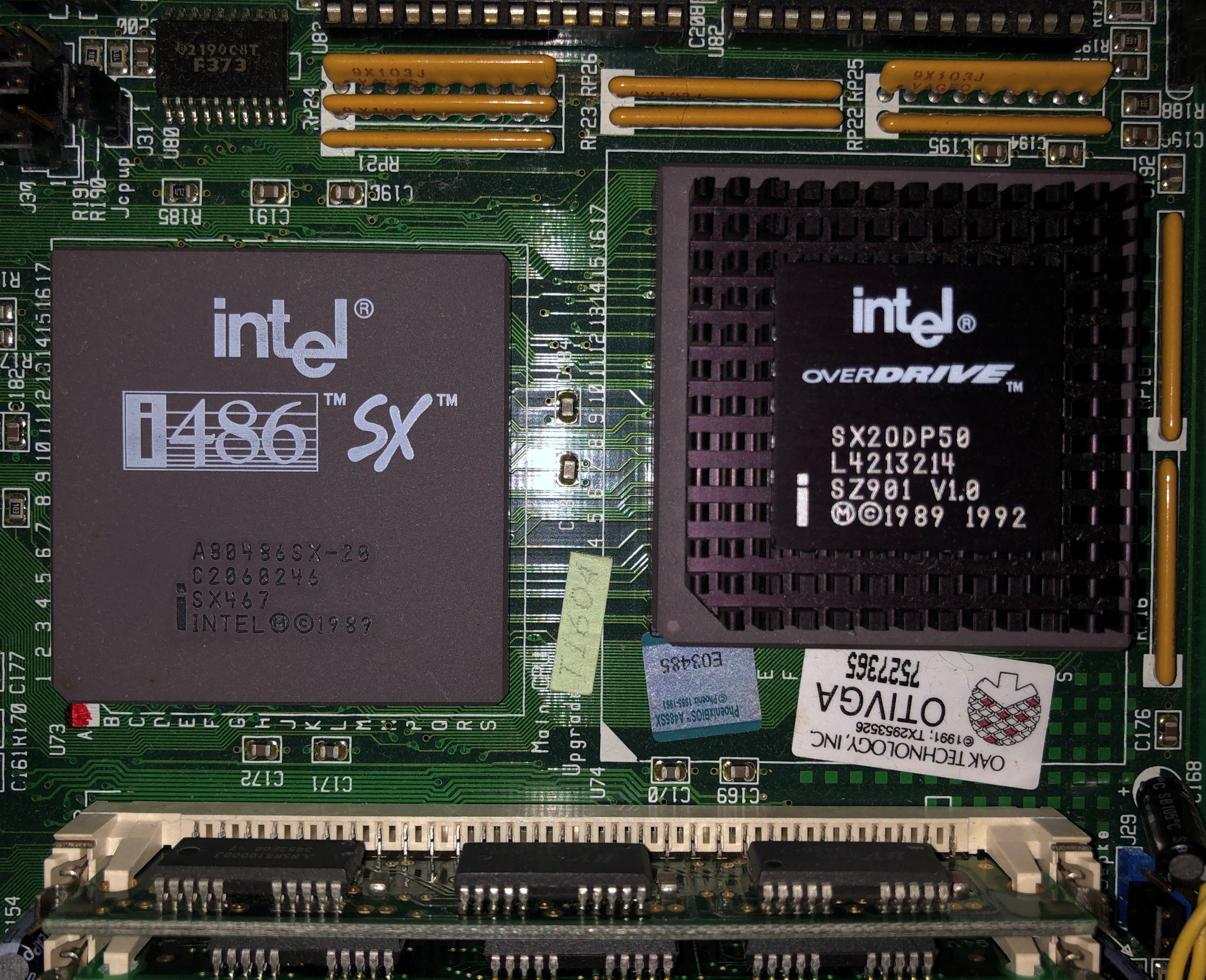
An Intel i486SX2-50 MHz OverDrive processor installed next to the original i486SX processor.

Intel's i486 OverDrive processors are a category of various Intel i486s that were produced with the designated purpose of being used to upgrade personal computers. The OverDrives typically possessed qualities different from 'standard' i486s with the same speed steppings. Those included built-in voltage regulators, different pin-outs, write-back cache instead of write-through cache, built-in heatsinks, and fanless operation — features that made them more able to work where an ordinary edition of a particular model would not.

It is based on the Intel486 DX2 microprocessor technology. Each 486 Overdrive typically came in two versions, ODP and ODPR variants. The ODPR chips had 168 pins and functioned as complete swap-out replacements for existing chips, whereas the ODP chips had an extra 169th pin, and were used for inserting into the 169-pin 487SX socket (later branded as "OverDrive Ready" socket, since known as Socket 1) available in 486SX motherboards, which would disable the existing 486SX CPU. ODP chips will not work in Pre-Socket 1 486 boards (168-pin, a.k.a. "Socket 0", the original 486DX socket) due to the extra pin. The ODP and ODPR labeling can be found in the CPU's model number(i.e.: DX2ODPR66).

== Models ==
Models available included:

- 20 MHz FSB, 40 MHz clock speed. This version of the 20-MHz Overdrive (ODP) was available for the 16- and 20-MHz Intel486 SX CPU for US$549. Price were dropped to US$449 about four months later. This variant was exclusive as an OverDrive model with no OEM variant, and was initially confusingly labeled as a "486SX-20" despite the floating-point unit being present (which would make it a "DX").
- 25 MHz FSB, 50 MHz clock speed. The 25-MHz OverDrive (ODP) version was available for US$699. This version of CPU price were dropped to US$599 about four months later. The ODPR486 DX-25 was available for US$599.
- 33 MHz FSB, 66 MHz clock speed. Both ODP486 DX-33 and ODPR486 DX-33 were available for US$799 each.
- 25 MHz FSB, 75 MHz clock speed (DX4 OverDrive)
- 33 MHz FSB, 100 MHz clock speed (DX4 OverDrive)

Two P54 core Pentium-based CPUs were released for PGA 238 Socket 2/Socket 3-based systems (see Pentium OverDrive).

== See also ==
- RapidCAD
