= I486SX =

Type of microprocessor

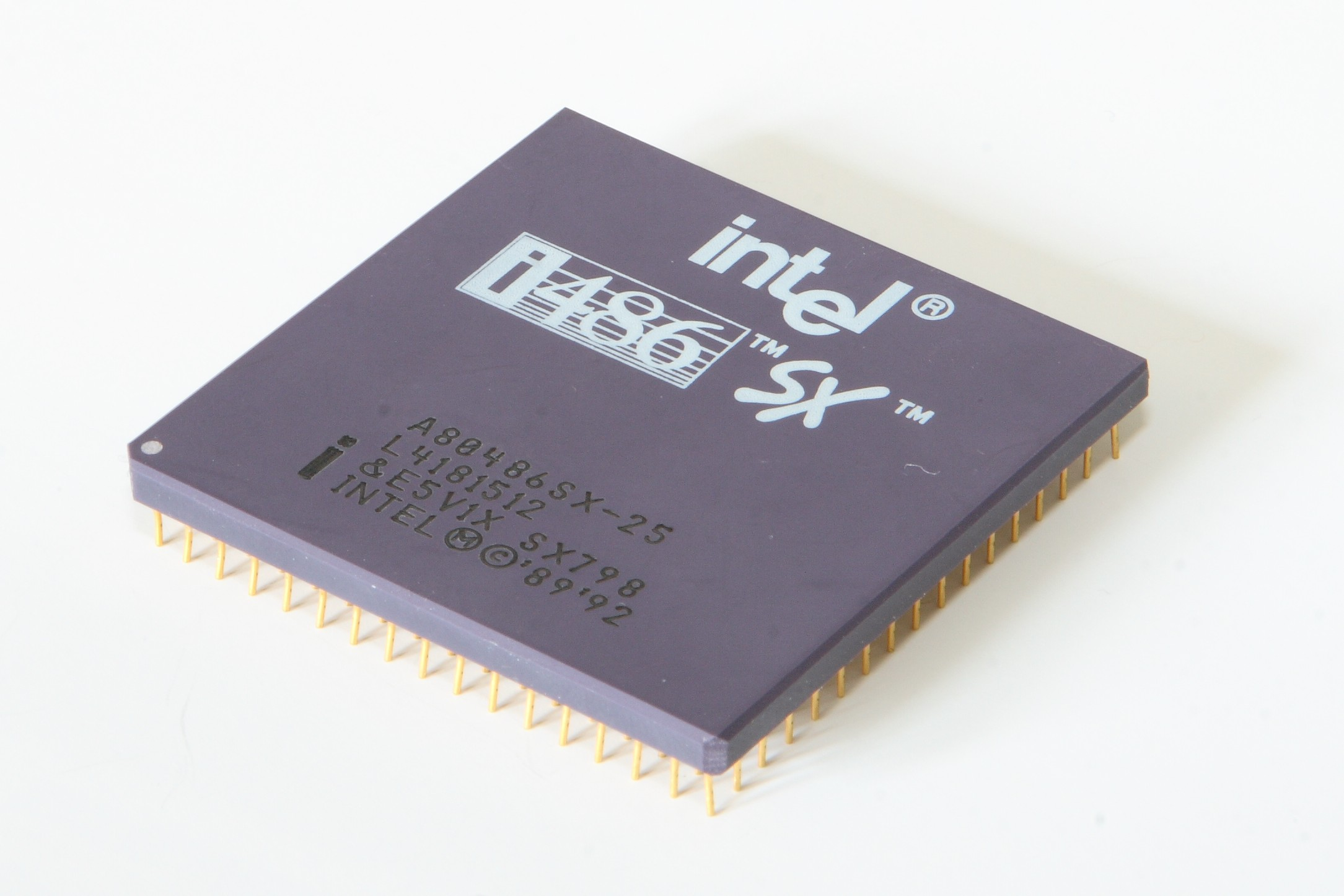
The Intel i486SX, 25-MHz version

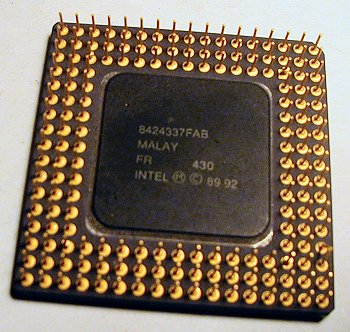
Pin side of an i486SX

The i486SX was a microprocessor originally released by Intel in 1991. It was a modified Intel i486DX microprocessor with its floating-point unit (FPU) disabled. Priced at US$258, it was intended as a cheaper, lower-end option, denoted by the SX suffix, in line with the earlier i386SX. However, unlike the i386SX, which had a 16-bit external data bus and a 24-bit external address bus (compared to the fully 32-bit i386DX, its higher-end counterpart), the i486SX was entirely 32-bit.

The Intel486 SX-20 CPU can perform up 20 MIPS at 25 MHz, 70% faster than the 33 MHz Intel386 DX with external cache.

== Overview ==
In the early 1990s, common applications, such as word processors and database applications, did not need or benefit from a floating-point unit (FPU). Among the rare exceptions were CAD applications, which benefited immensely from a faster hardware FPU rather than slower software floating-point calculations. AMD had begun manufacturing its i386DX clone, the Am386, which was faster than Intel's. In response, Intel wanted to provide a lower cost i486 CPU for system integrators, but without sacrificing the better profit margins of a full i486. Intel accomplished this with the i486SX, the first revisions of which were practically identical to the i486 but with its floating-point unit internally disabled. (Note: A long-standing rumor was that the first batches of the i486SX were i486 chips with defective floating-point units on their dies. However, Alex Witkowski, Intel alumnus and an engineer behind the i486SX, rejected this on the OS/2 Museum blog, writing that the floating-point units of the original i486 chip die to be converted to i486SX were never tested, and that only by grounding a certain bond wire in the CPU package was this conversion accomplished. In support of the theory are additional differences in how the two processors identify themselves with different model numbers (these processors send self-identifying information after reset; an on-demand CPUID was not invented yet).) The i486SX was introduced in mid-1991 at 20 MHz with 8KB of cache in a pin grid array (PGA) package. There were low-power versions of 16, 20, and 25 MHz Intel486 SX microprocessors. They were available for US$235, US$266, and US$366 respectively, in quantities of 1,000 pieces. Later versions of the i486SX, from 1992 onward, had the FPU entirely removed for cost-cutting reasons and came in surface-mount packages as well.

The first computer system to ship with an i486SX installed from the factory was Advanced Logic Research's Business VEISA 486/20SX in April 1991. Initial reviews of the i486SX chip were generally poor among technology publications and the buying public, who deemed it an example of crippleware.

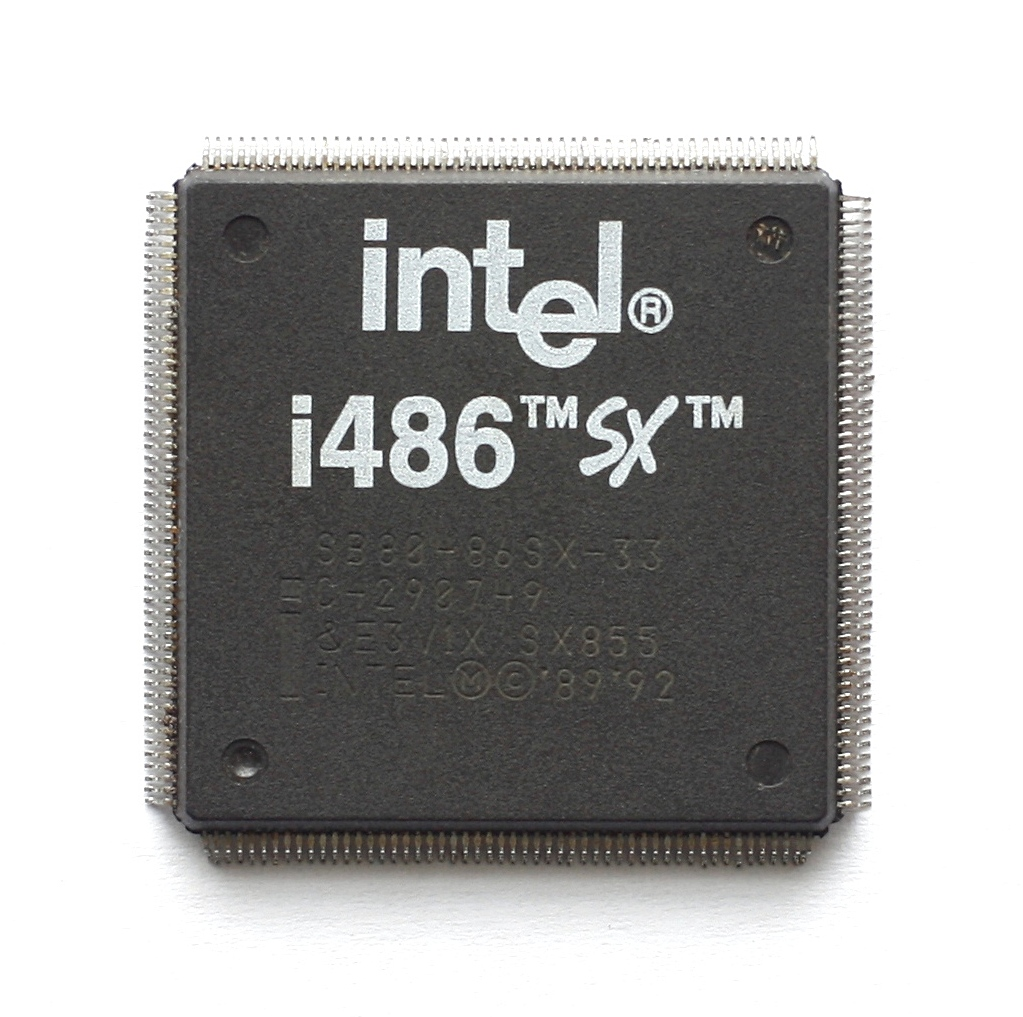
Embedded SQFP version of the i486SX

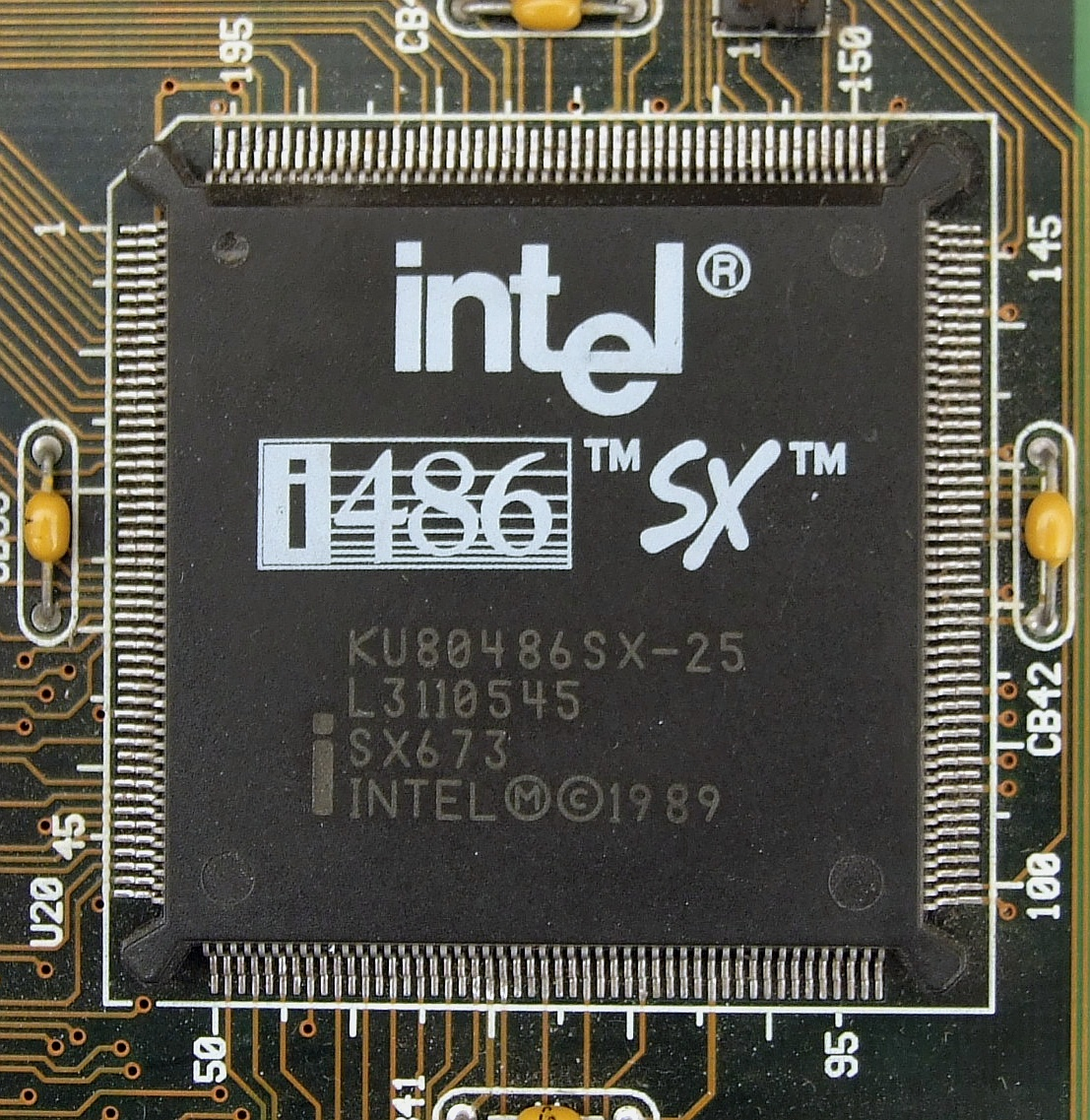
BQFP version of the i486sx

Many systems allowed the user to upgrade the i486SX to a CPU with the FPU enabled. The upgrade was shipped as the i487, which was actually a full i486DX chip with an extra pin. The extra pin has no electrical connection; its purpose is to physically prevent the chip from being installed incorrectly ("keying"). (Note: This is not the same as the NC# pin used to shut down the i486SX. NC# is one of the standard 168 pins of the i486, not an extra pin. (NC stands for Not Connect, in the sense of "Do Not Connect". # indicates that it is active on pull-down.))) The i487 would effectively take over the functionality of the existing i486SX, rendering it inactive. The choice to leave the original CPU in place was made because the original i486SX was physically hard to remove, typically being installed in non-ZIF sockets or in a surface-mount package that was soldered to the motherboard. Later i486 OverDrive processors also plugged into the 169-pin socket (since named Socket 1) and offered further performance enhancements over the i487. Some 486 OverDrive processors were branded as "486SX", as they target the 486SX users (and to distinguish from products intended for 486DX users), but does have the floating-point unit quietly present.
