= Pentium OverDrive =

Microprocessor developed by Intel

The Pentium OverDrive was a microprocessor marketing brand name used by Intel, to cover a variety of consumer upgrade products sold in the mid-1990s. It was originally released for 486 motherboards, and later some Pentium sockets, as well as a version for Socket 8.

== 486 sockets ==
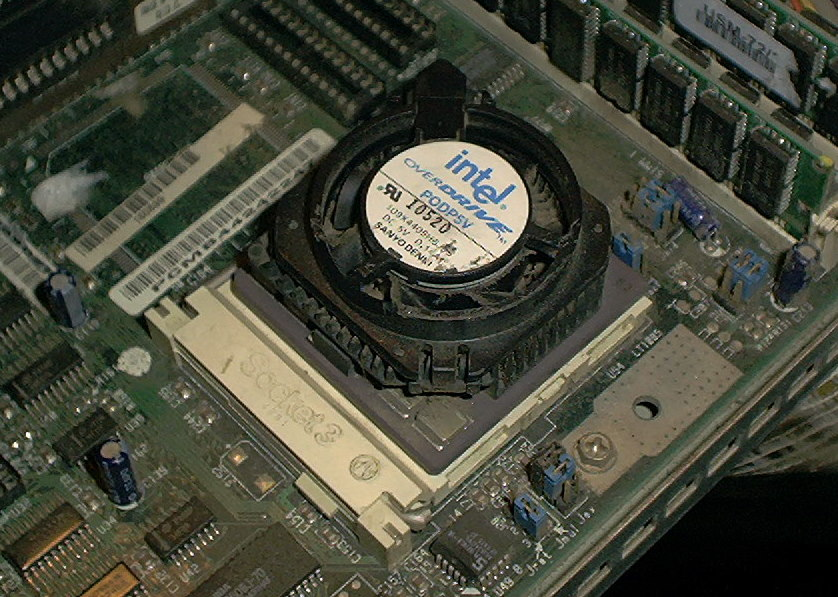
Pentium OverDrive for 486 systems

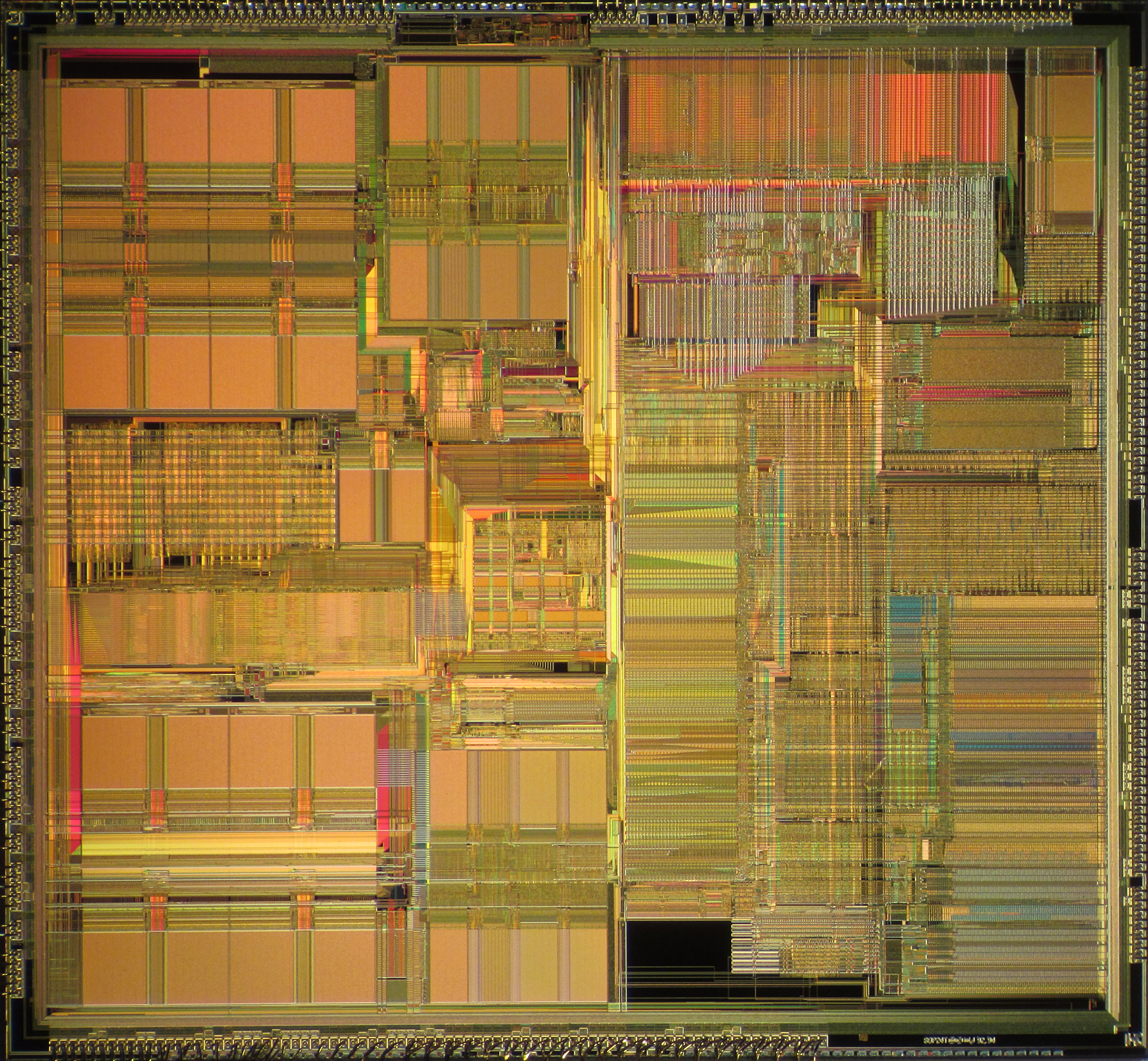
Die shot of Pentium OverDrive for 486 systems

The Pentium OverDrive is a heavily modified, 3.3-volt Pentium P54 core manufactured on 0.6 micrometer technology. It is fitted with a 486-compatible bus unit (though with an increased pin-count), an integrated heatsink and fan, and 32 kB of level 1 cache, double the 16 kB offered on regular P54C chips. As the data bus was effectively reduced to 32-bit width, per-clock performance was much lower than that of a 'regular' Pentium, though still substantially faster compared to a similarly clocked 486 owing to the Pentium's architectural improvements, such as the much improved FPU. It was also equipped with an integrated 3.3 volt power regulator as many 486 motherboards only provided 5 volt power.

The 63 MHz model was launched in February 1995, and supported 25 MHz bus systems. The much faster 83 MHz version, which supported both 25 (63 MHz effective) and 33 MHz bus systems, launched much later the same year on September, and was very expensive at $299 compared to other upgrade alternatives, such as those based on AMD's 5x86 and Cyrix's Cx5x86 chips.

The processor's heatsink is permanently attached, and the removable fan module is powered via spring-like metal prongs that connect to a trio of conductors on the surface of the chip. The clip that releases the fan is visible in the first photo, at the top left corner of the CPU. The central plastic "column" that leads from the center of the fan houses the fan wiring and leads down the side of the heatsink at this corner. The small plastic points at each top left of this column are the locking mechanism for the fan and are released by squeezing them. The opposite corner of the CPU has a latch that locks the fan around underneath the heatsink, by swinging into place upon assembly. The processor monitors the fan and will throttle back on clock speed to prevent overheating and damage if the fan is not operating. This is a predecessor to the internal temperature detection and protection in Intel's modern processors.

=== Compatibility and performance ===
During development, Intel had changed the design specification, causing various compatibility and performance problems with some boards that were previously fully compatible. For instance, the Packard Bell 450 motherboard required a specially designed interposer to be installed between the processor and the motherboard to cope with the changed specification, with the unfortunate consequence of precluding access to the motherboard's level 2 cache, resulting in sub-par performance. In addition, some older chipsets do not support the write-back functionality of the chip's level 1 cache, which could also reduce performance. However, the majority of Socket 3 motherboards, particularly later (post-1994) VLB and most PCI boards, provide proper support for the Pentium OverDrive including fully operational access to the level 2 cache, and many earlier boards also support the processor with varying levels of compatibility and performance.

Performance-wise, many popular synthetic benchmarks of the time showed the Pentium OverDrive under-performing its much cheaper and higher-clocked rivals, though its real-world performance (given the motherboard cache was being optimally used) could be much different: programs that were floating-point dependent or optimized for the Pentium architecture (as were both becoming increasingly common in the mid to late nineties) derived a more substantial benefit from the Pentium OverDrive, particularly the 83 MHz version. In addition, it fully supported programs and operating systems specifically coded for the Pentium architecture, such as many emulators, multimedia utilities and even later Windows operating systems and games; however, the benefit of running such programs on a clock- and motherboard bus-constrained system may be questionable.

=== Models ===
PODP5V63

- Introduced February 3, 1995
- 234 pins, P24T pinout
- 5 or 3.3 volts
- L1 Cache 32 kB (16 kB + 16 kB)
- 63 MHz on 25 MHz front side bus (25 × 2.5)

PODP5V83

- Introduced September 1995
- 234 pins, P24T pinout
- 5 or 3.3 volts
- L1 Cache 32 kB (16 kB + 16 kB)
- 83 MHz on 33 MHz front side bus (33 × 2.5)

Some 63 CPU models (part number 109X4405H6J05) have 234 pins instead of 235. Some CPUs came with the pin chopped off (Pin A4) and others had the pin completely missing and covered with the encapsulation.

== Pentium sockets ==
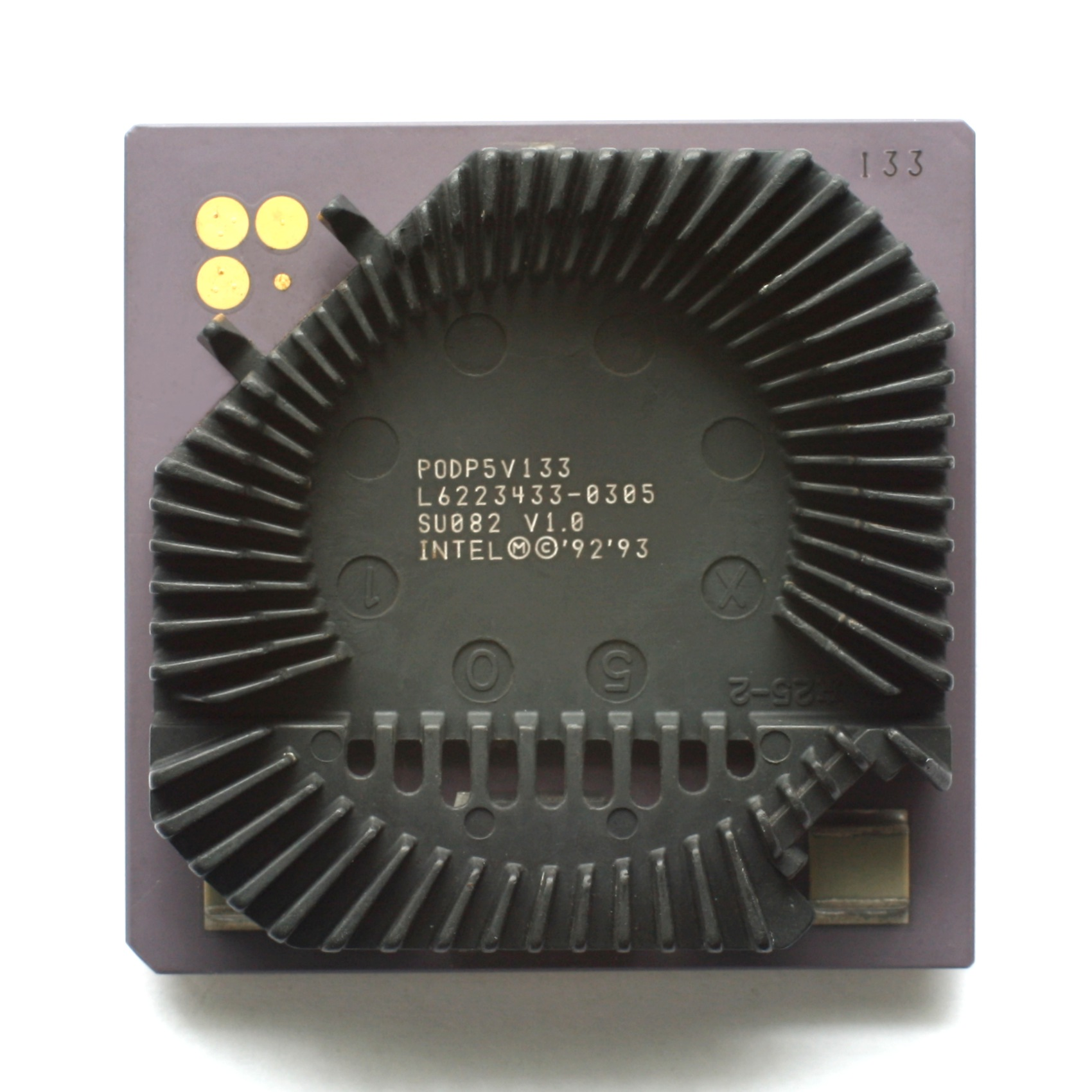
Pentium Overdrive for Socket 4 without fan

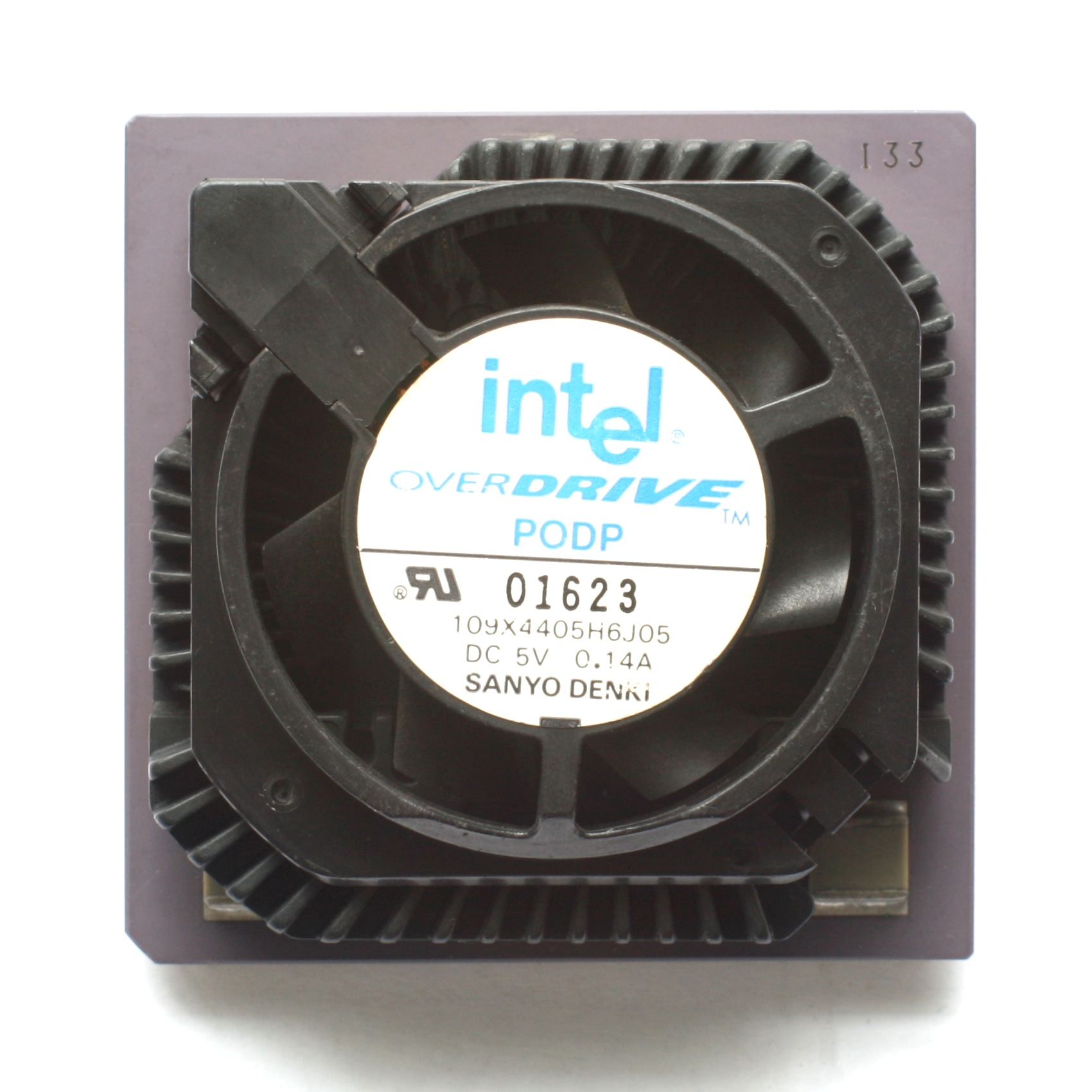
Pentium Overdrive for Socket 4, 120/133 MHz.

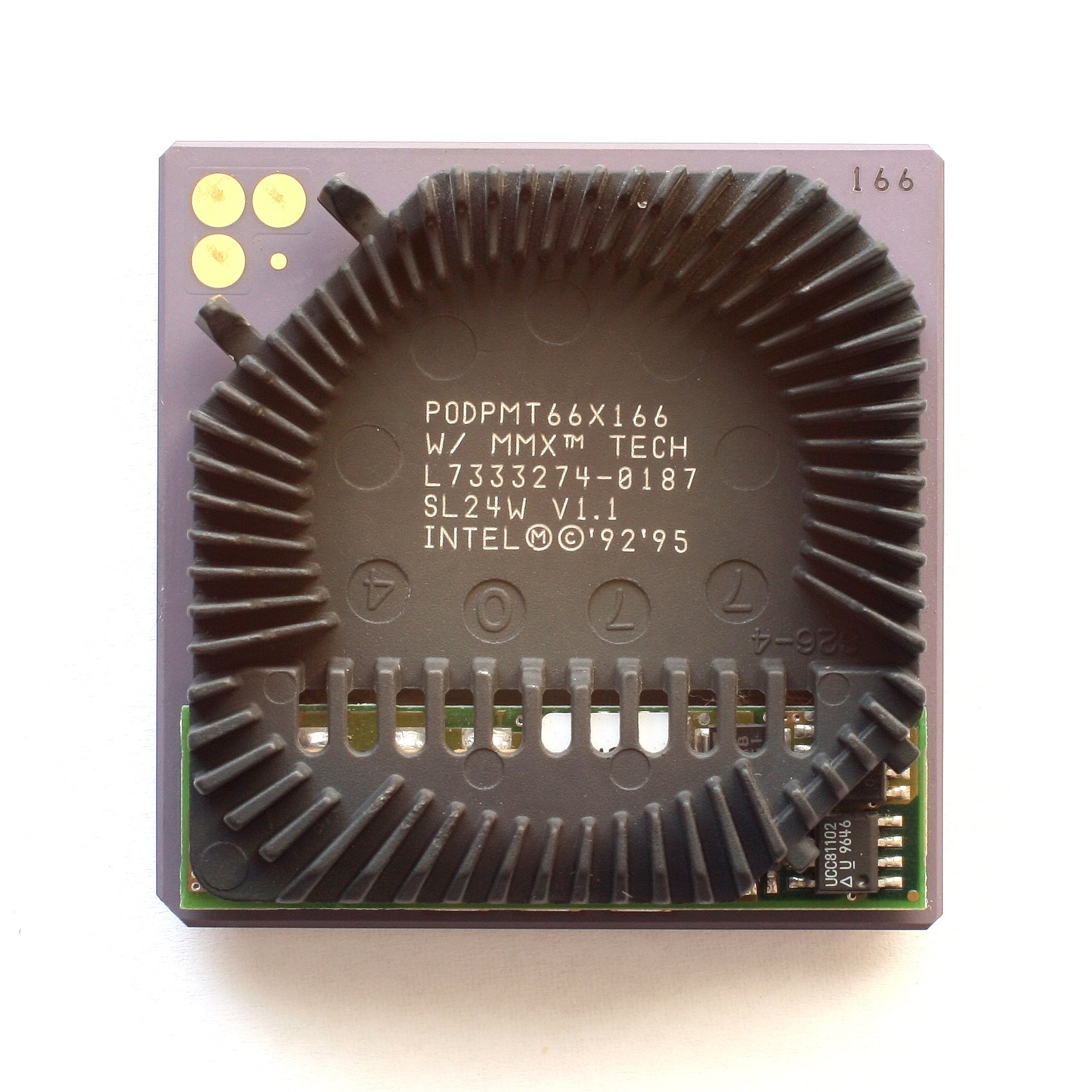
Pentium Overdrive MMX without fan.

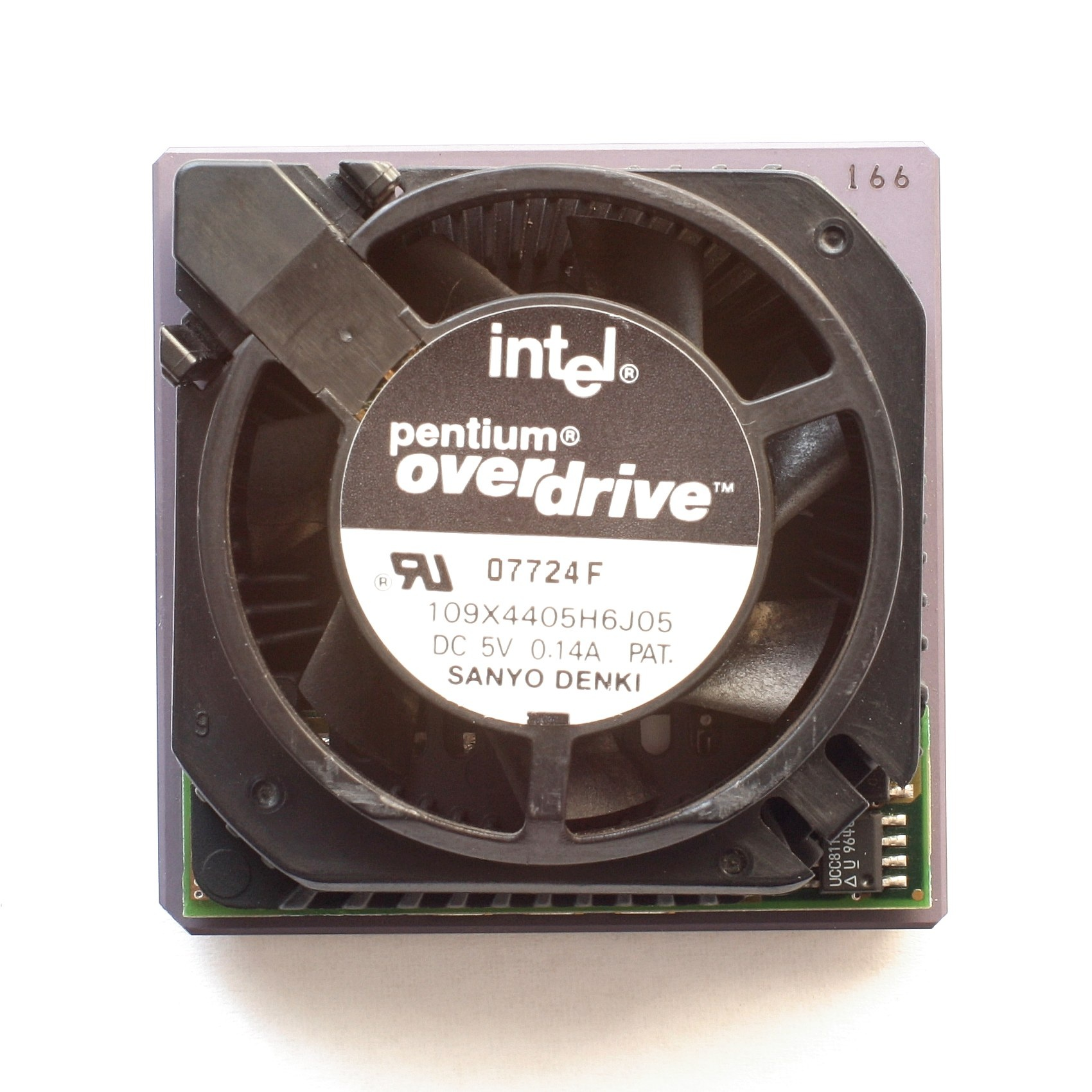
Pentium Overdrive MMX, 166 MHz.

The original Socket 4 Pentium chips ran at higher voltages (5V) than later models. Although little known, Intel did in fact release an OverDrive chip for these sockets, that used an internal clock multiplier of 2, to change them to a "120/133" machine.

- PODP5V120: 120 MHz on 60 MHz bus
- PODP5V133: 133 MHz on 66 MHz bus or 120 MHz on 60 MHz bus

The OverDrive Processors for the Pentium 75, 90 and 100 were also released (Socket 5, 3.3 V), running at 125, 150 and 166 MHz (clock multiplier of 2.5). The 125 is an oddity, because Intel never made a Pentium 125 as a stand-alone processor.

- PODP3V125: 125 MHz on 50 MHz bus
- PODP3V150: 150 MHz on 60 MHz bus
- PODP3V166: 166 MHz on 66 MHz bus

These were replaced by Pentium OverDrive MMX, which also upgraded the Pentium 120 - 200 MHz to the faster version with MMX technology.

- PODPMT60X150: up to 150 MHz on 60 MHz bus (clock multiplier of 2.5)
- PODPMT66X166: up to 166 MHz on 66 MHz bus (clock multiplier of 2.5)
- PODPMT60X180: up to 180 MHz on 60 MHz bus (clock multiplier of 3.0)
- PODPMT66X200: up to 200 MHz on 66 MHz bus (clock multiplier of 3.0)

== Socket 8 ==
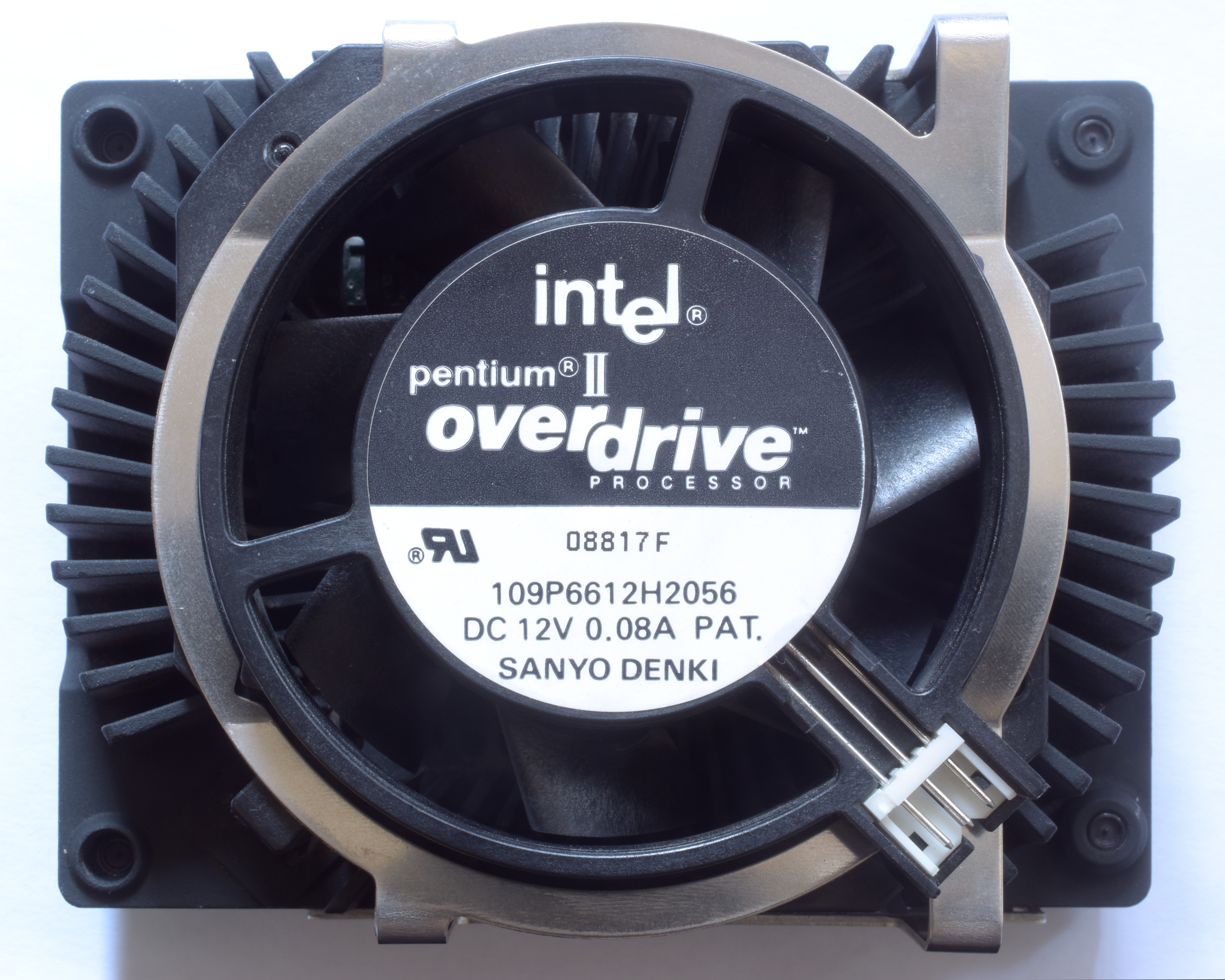
Top view of the Intel Pentium II OverDrive CPU with heatsink and fan.

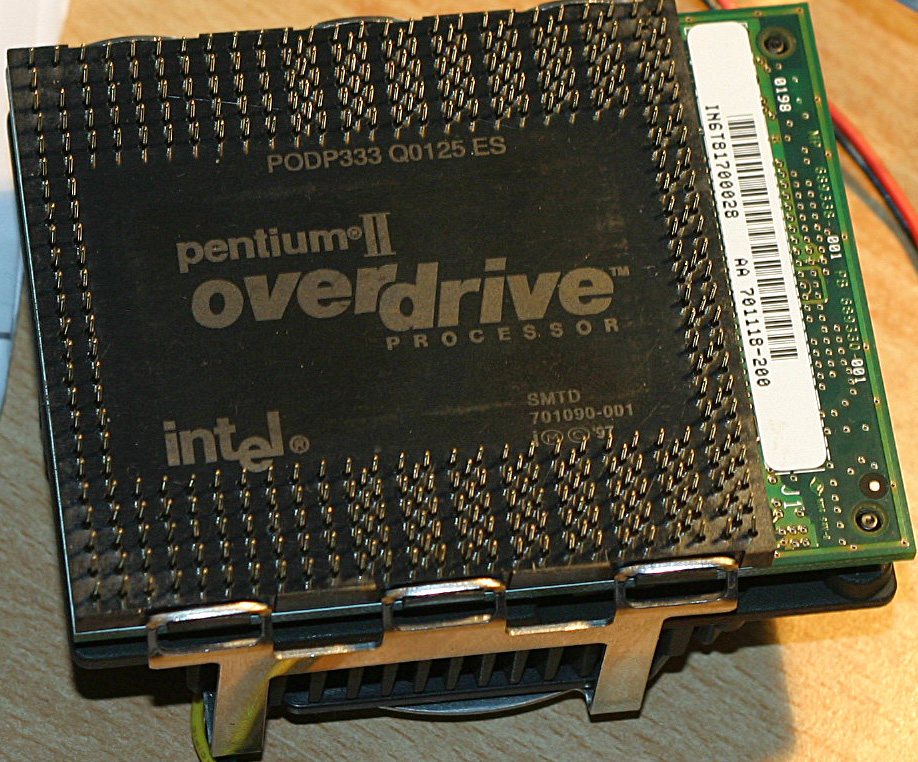
An engineering sample version of the Pentium II OverDrive, showing the bottom of the unit.

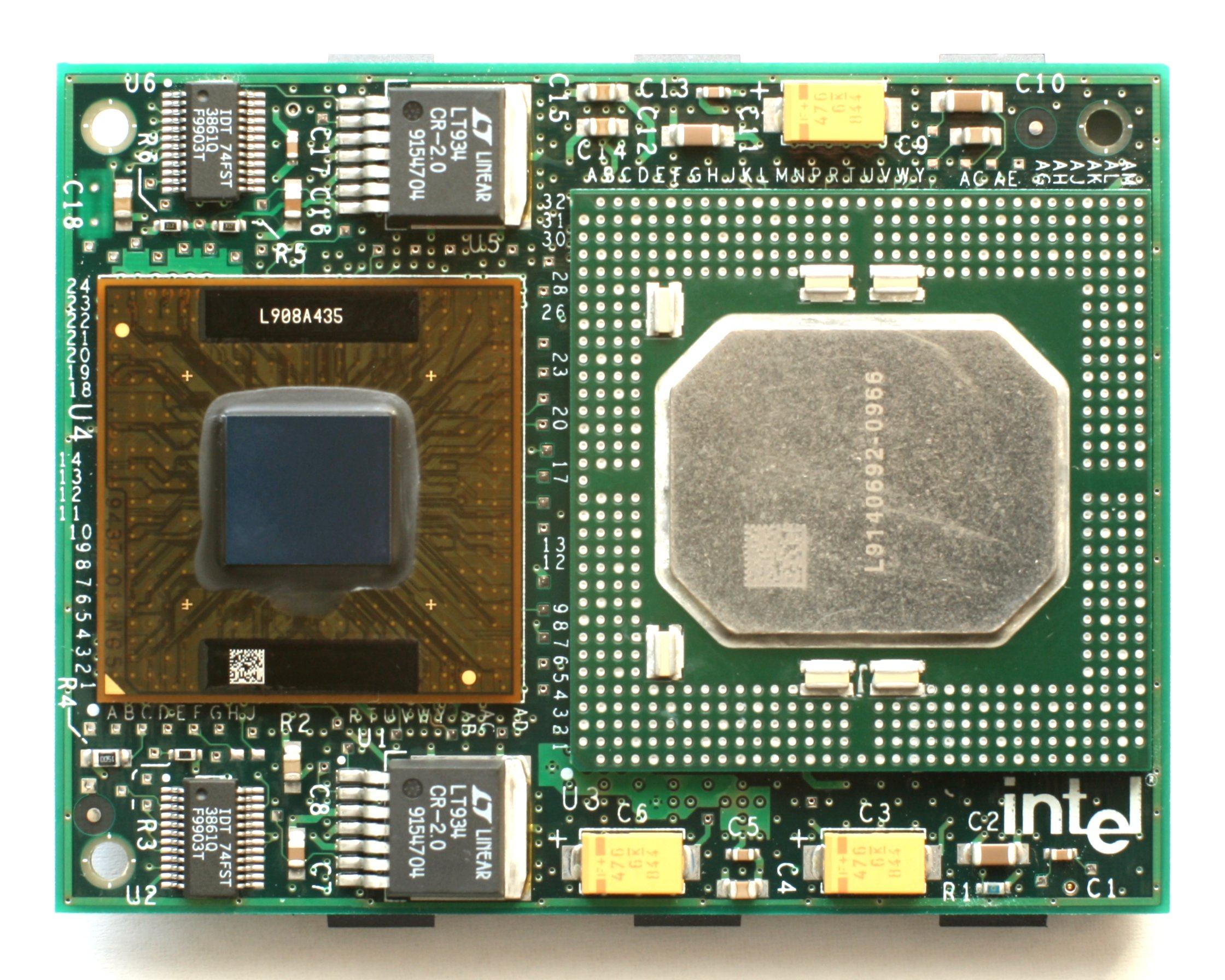
Pentium II OverDrive without heatsink. Flip-chip Deschutes core is on left. 512 kB cache is on right.

In 1998, the Pentium II OverDrive was released as an upgrade path for Pentium Pro owners. Combining the 0.25 μm Deschutes core of the Pentium II in a flip-chip package with a 512 kB full-speed L2 cache chip from the Pentium II Xeon into a Socket 8-compatible module, this resulted in a processor that could run at 300 or 333 MHz on a 60 or 66 MHz front side bus. This combination also brought together some of the more attractive aspects of the Pentium II and the Pentium II Xeon: MMX support/improved 16-bit performance and full-speed L2 cache respectively. This configuration would be replicated by the later "Dixon" mobile Pentium II core with 256 kB of full-speed cache embedded on-die, as well as the later "Coppermine" and "Tualatin" Pentium III cores using the same 256 kB full-speed cache embedded on-die.

This upgrade could be used in single and dual processor Socket 8 systems. It does not support quad (and even hexa) processor Socket 8 systems due to it lacking four-way or higher multiprocessing, however it can work in two sockets of quad processor Socket 8 systems with CPU 3 and 4 removed. Unofficially, it could also be run in quad and hexa processor Socket 8 systems. This came about after some users upgraded their ALR 6x6 systems with them.

These upgrades are notable for being used in Intel's ASCI Red supercomputer stationed at Sandia National Laboratories, which was the first computer to break the teraFLOPS performance mark in late 1996 and formerly held the position of the world's fastest computer on the TOP500 list from its first full operations in 1997 up until late 2000. Up until the upgrade, it ran on dual Pentium Pro CPUs in each of its computing nodes since its inception, which were upgraded to dual Pentium II OverDrive CPUs on all of its 4,510 computing nodes in 1999, further maintaining its position on the TOP500 list at that time until it was surpassed by IBM's ASCI White supercomputer stationed at Lawrence Livermore National Laboratory in late 2000 while at the same time making it the first computer to break over two teraFLOPS at the time of the upgrade. ASCI Red continued to use these CPUs for the remainder of its life until it was decommissioned in 2006.

In Intel's "Family/Model/Stepping" scheme, the Pentium II OverDrive CPU is family 6, model 3. Despite being based on the Deschutes core, it identifies itself as a Klamath Pentium II when queried by the CPUID command. As noted in the Pentium II Processor update documentation from Intel, "although this processor has a CPUID of 163xh, it uses a Pentium II processor CPUID 065xh processor core."

- PODP66X333: 300/333 MHz on 60/66 MHz bus

== See also ==
- Intel 80486 OverDrive
- RapidCAD
