= Intel DX2 =

Clock-doubled i486

i486 DX2
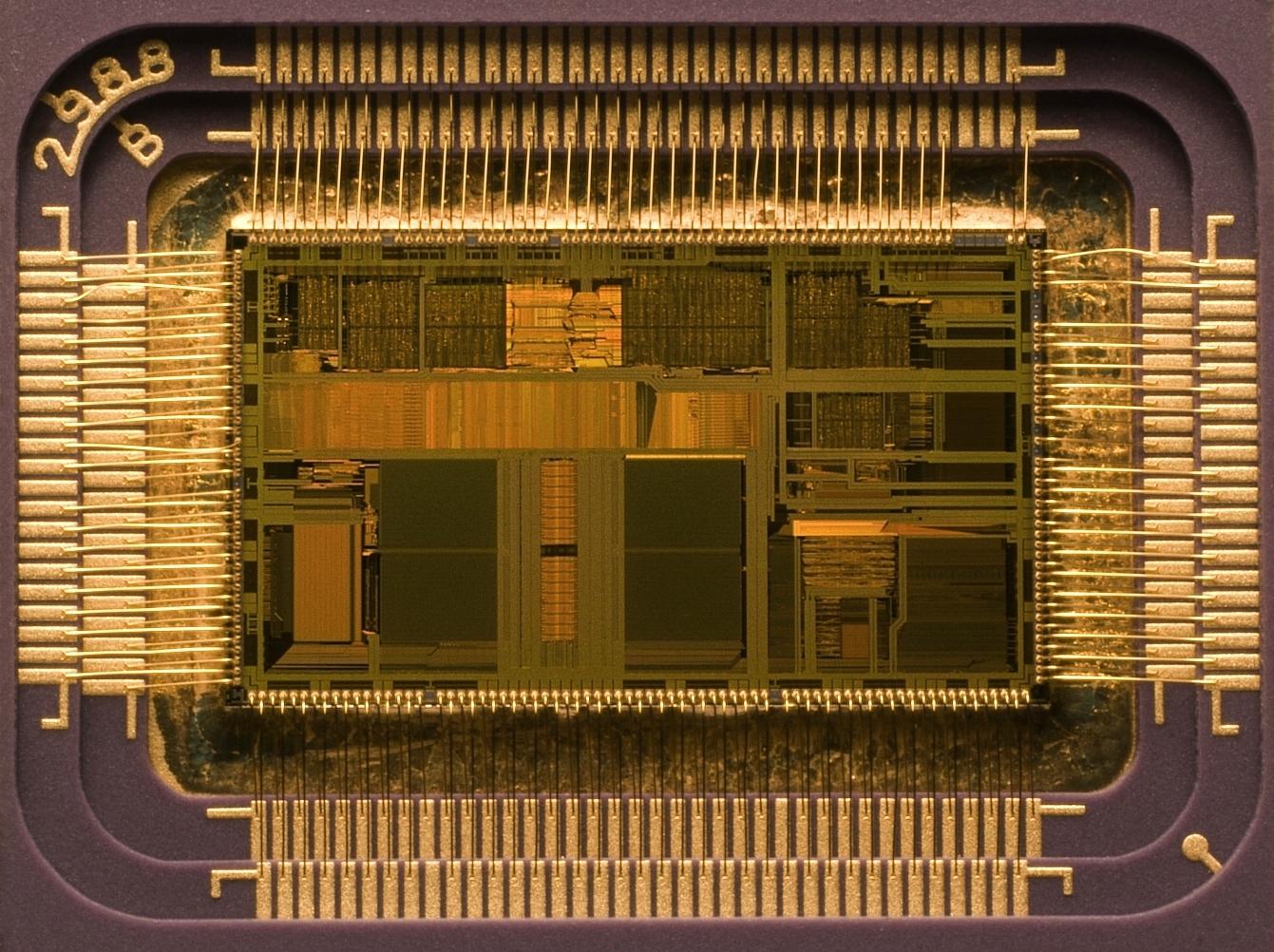
- The exposed die of an Intel 486DX2

General information
- Launched: 1992
- Designed by: Intel
- Common manufacturer: Intel

Performance
- Max. CPU clock rate: 25/50 to 33/66 MHz

Architecture and classification
- Technology node: 800 nm
- Instruction set: x86-16, IA-32

History
- Successors: Pentium/i586 (P5), Celeron

Support status
- Unsupported

The i486 DX2 (also known as the 80486DX2 and Intel486 DX2) is a CPU introduced by Intel in 1992. It was based on the i486 DX but incorporated a clock multiplier that doubled the processor's internal clock frequency relative to its external bus. This allowed the processor to execute instructions at a higher clock rate without requiring a corresponding increase in bus speed. The DX2 was available in 25/50 MHz and 33/66 MHz versions, both manufactured using an 800 nm process.

The clock multiplier improved performance by approximately 50 to 70 percent over the i486 DX operating at the same external bus speed, depending on the application. The 50 MHz i486 DX2 achieved a rating of 40 Dhrystone MIPS, while the 66 MHz version achieved 54 MIPS using Dhrystone V1.1.

== Versions ==
Two major versions of the DX2 were produced, identified by the codes P24 and P24D. The P24D featured a faster L1 cache mode, known as write-back, which improved performance. The original P24 supported only the slower write-through cache mode. AMD and Cyrix also produced competing processors based on the Intel486 DX2.

The 50 MHz Intel486 DX2 was available for US$550 (equivalent to $1,262 in 2025) per unit in quantities of 1,000, while the 66 MHz version was priced at US$682 (equivalent to $1,565 in 2025).

Intel later introduced a 3.3-volt, 50 MHz version of the DX2 featuring System Management Mode (SMM). It consumed 1.5 watts, less than 60 percent of the power used by the equivalent 5-volt version. The processor used a 208-lead small quad flat package (SQFP) that required 30 percent less motherboard area and 40 percent less volume than the plastic quad flat package (PQFP) used by the standard Intel486. It was scheduled to become available in the fourth quarter of 1994 at US$463 per unit in quantities of 1,000.

== Gallery ==
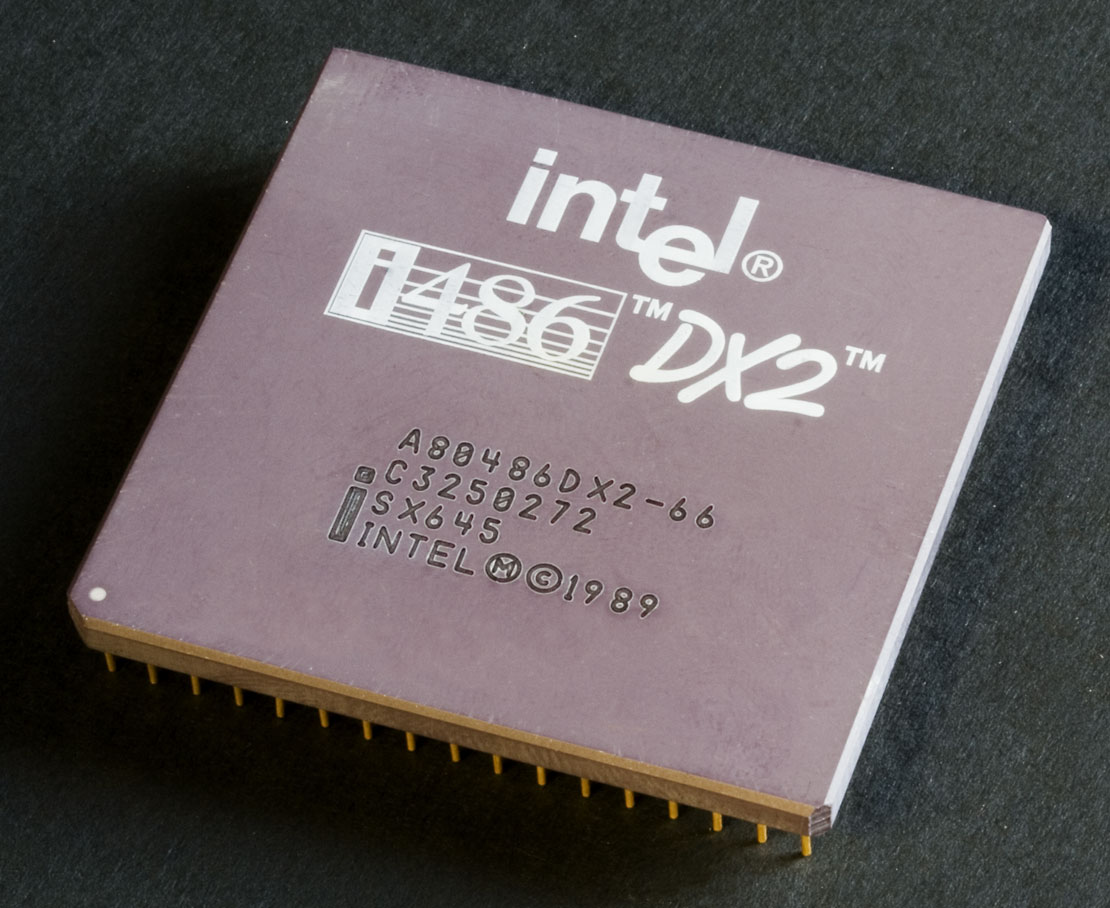
An Intel i486DX2-66 Microprocessor, top view.

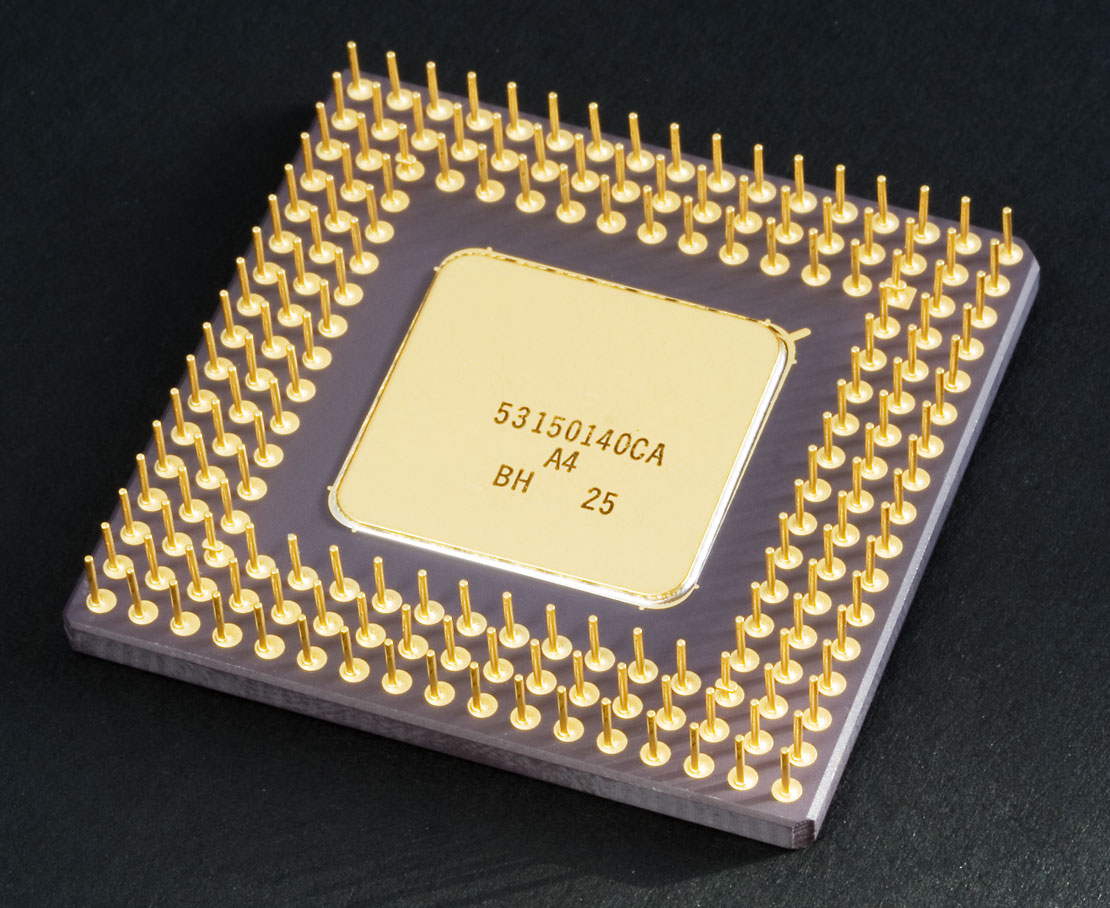
The bottom view with gold plated pins visible.

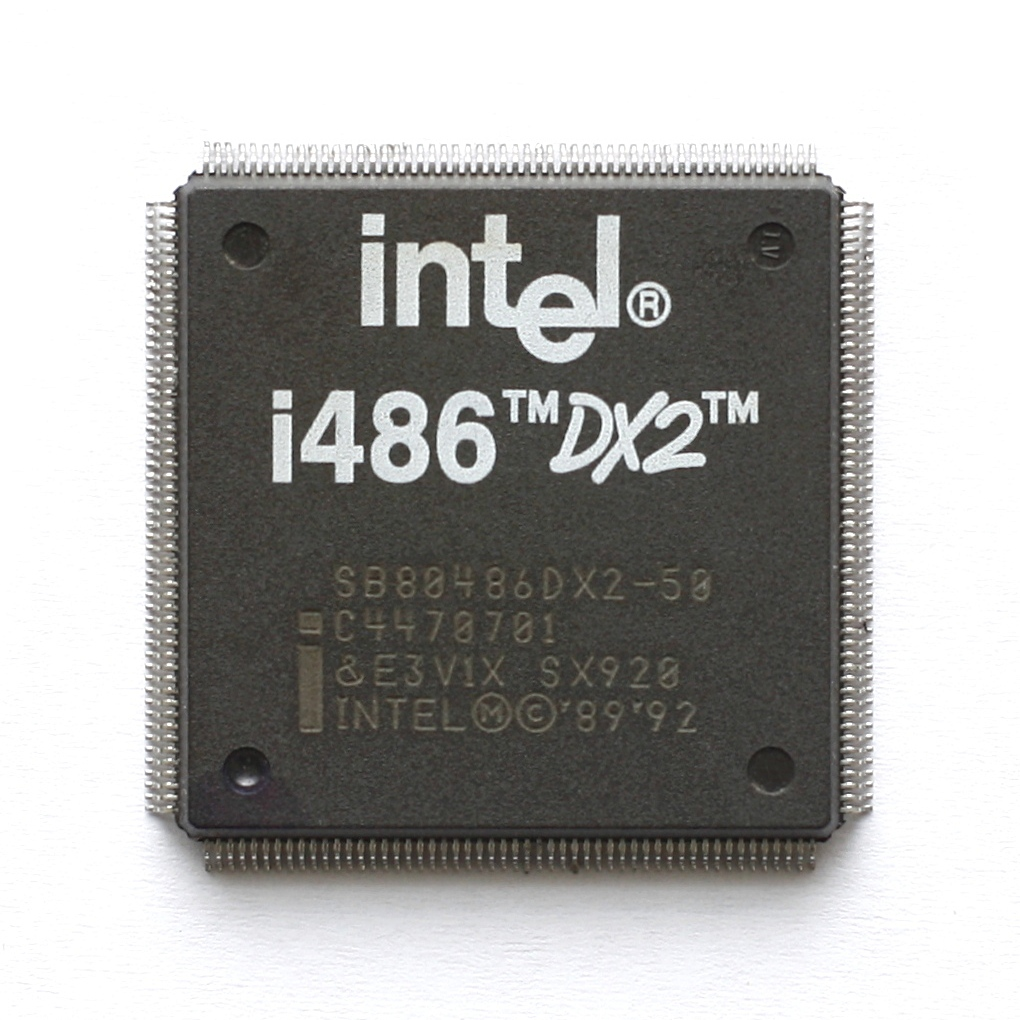
Embedded i486DX2 (SL enhanced, SQFP version).

== See also ==
- Intel DX4
