= Reply Corporation =

American computer company (1988–1997)

- Type: Private
- Industry: Computer
- Founded: 1988; 38 years ago
- Founder: Steve Petracca
- Defunct: 1997; 29 years ago
- Fate: Acquired by Radius
- Headquarters: San Jose, California
- Products: Reply Model 16; Reply Model 32; TurboProcessor; PowerBoard
- Number of employees: 100 (1992, peak)
- Website: reply.com at the Wayback Machine (archived November 13, 1996)

Reply Corporation, often shortened to Reply Corp., was an American computer company based in San Jose, California. Founded in 1988 by Steve Petracca, the company licensed the Micro Channel architecture from IBM for their own computers released in 1989, competing against IBM's PS/2 line. The company later divested from offering complete systems in favor of marketing motherboard upgrades for older PS/2s. Reply enjoyed a close relationship with IBM, owing to many of its founding employees, including Petracca, having worked for IBM. The company was acquired by Radius in 1997.

== History ==
=== Foundation ===
Reply Corp. was founded by Steve V. Petracca (born 1951 in Honolulu). Prior to founding Reply, Petracca worked at International Business Machines from 1976 to 1988, starting out at the company's Boulder, Colorado, office as an industrial engineer in various capacities. There he graduated from CU Boulder, with a bachelor's degree in history. In 1980, Petracca moved to Boca Raton, Florida, to work at IBM's facility there, managing the start-up of the first production line for the IBM PC. Petracca graduated from Nova Southeastern University with an MBA and was promoted to manager of new product operations in the mid-1980s, handling the release strategy and ramp-up of the Personal System/2—IBM's intended successor to the PC—before being promoted to manager of business analysis for their Entry Systems Division sometime around 1987. In 1987, Petracca moved again to White Plains, New York, where he worked as manager of systems technology, which encompassed IBM's RISC-based workstations, printers, displays and Personal Systems.

Petracca quit IBM in 1988, dissatisfied with a culture he perceived as promoting the creation of needless business units and obsession with data visualization: "We would get into meetings and spend more time arguing over whether to use pie charts or bar charts than over the content of the data". That year, he moved to San Jose, California, and started Reply Corporation. Petracca obtained the funding to start his company from friends and family, as well as with his severance package from IBM. He poached several IBM employees for his startup, many of whom were on the development team of the PS/2.

Petracca and his employees spent a year devising the company's first products, which were a line of desktop computers based on IBM's Micro Channel architecture: the Reply 286/16, the Reply 286/20, and the 386SX/16. According to InformationWeek, Reply was the first company to license Micro Channel—a bus architecture which IBM introduced with the PS/2 and which Petracca helped launch—for a PS/2 clone. However they were beaten to market with a PS/2 clone by Tandy Corporation, who released the 5000 MC in 1988. The Reply computers were introduced ahead of the 1989 COMDEX/Fall in November, with the company releasing the 286/16 and 286/20 the following month. These two machines competed with the Models 50 and 60, mid-ranged computers in the PS/2 line which IBM introduced in 1987. Those PS/2s featured 10-MHz Intel 80286 microprocessors clocked at 10 MHz, while the Reply models had 80286 processors clocked at 16 MHz and 20 MHz respectively. The 386SX/16 had an 80386SX clocked at 16 MHz.

Reply touted the modularity of these computers, arranging their cases in a so-called "5×5" design: five drive bays and five expansion slots. Additionally the microprocessors were located on daughterboards connected to the motherboard. This daughterboard approach, which Reply termed the TurboProcessor, meant that the computers could be upgraded with faster processors over the lifespans of the motherboards. Reply included this feature to address the concerns of existing PS/2 owners, who feared that their investments were fast becoming obsolete. Reply were the only makers of PS/2 clones with 286 processors; according to PCWeek, MCA-equipped IBM PS/2s with these processors were skipped over by all but the most budget-conscious corporate buyers, making these Reply models relatively unpopular compared to the 386SX/16, which they released in 1990.

=== IBM partnership ===
In October 1990, Reply joined thirteen other makers of MCA machines—including IBM—in an alliance to push Micro Channel as the sole standard for 32-bit computers. This alliance, named the Micro Channel Developers Association, was intended to compete with the so-called Gang of Nine, an aggregate of PC clone manufacturers unofficially led by Compaq and Hewlett-Packard, who were backing the Extended Industry Standard Architecture directly against IBM.

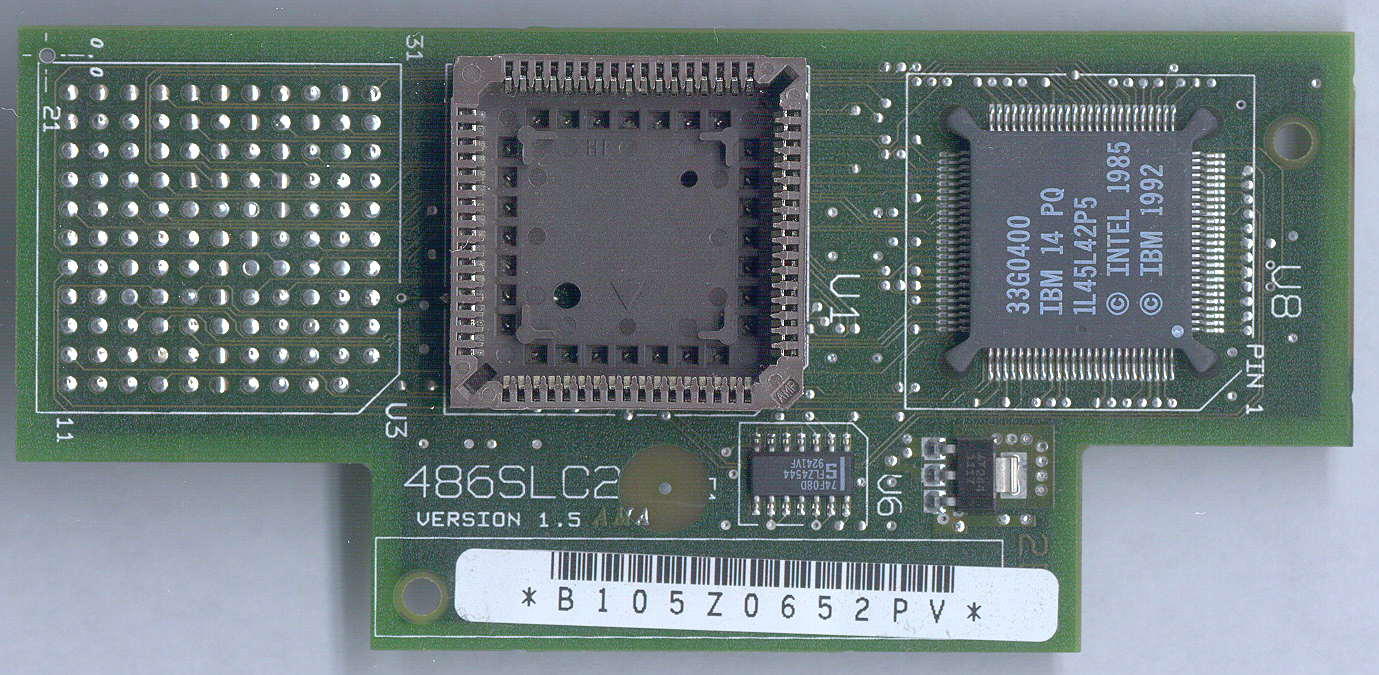
An example of the IBM processor complex, competing technology to the TurboBoard

Also in that month, Reply released their first Micro Channel expansion card, the Token Ring Adapter/A, as well as their next generation of 32-bit Micro Channel machines with TurboProcessor, the Model 32. The most-expensive computer in this line, featuring an i486 clocked at 33 MHz, sold for $12,895 ($31,778 in 2025). A comparably equipped PS/2, the Model 90 XP, sold for $16,695 ($41,142 in 2025) simultaneously. Like the Reply Model 32, the PS/2 Model 95 XP featured an upgradable processor slot, which IBM termed the "processor complex". Unlike with Reply's TurboComplex, IBM forbade the buyer from upgrading their own computer, requiring an authorized service personnel to perform the upgrade for a fee. The Reply Model 32 also supported industry-standard SIMMs for RAM, whereas IBM used proprietary RAM modules for their PS/2 Model 95.

Reply further strengthened their relationship with IBM upon signing a license in May 1991 that allowed them to equip their MCA machines with official IBM SCSI and ESDI hard drives, the Model M keyboard and PC DOS, as well as OS/2 Extended Edition. Also in 1991, Reply was the first customer of IBM's printed circuit board manufacturing plant in Austin, Texas. The plant's output was previously only for IBM; that year, it began converting to a contract manufacturing model for outside companies. In August 1992, IBM signed an agreement with Reply that allowed them to offer computers with IBM's 386SLC and 486SLC processors, making Reply the first company to offer computers with IBM silicon based on Intel's x86 architecture. Because IBM's contract with Intel forbade IBM from selling their 386SLC on the open market as a standalone part, IBM had to manufacture the processor on a TurboProcessor board. The Model 16 386SLC, released in August 1992 and replacing Reply's earlier Model 16 386SX/20, featured this IBM-built TurboProcessor. The upgrade resulted in an over twofold performance boost for the same price point as the 386SX, according to Petracca, who shelved further TurboProcessor releases featuring Intel's 16-bit processors in favor of IBM's as a result.

=== Restructuring ===
Reply laid off 40 of its 100 employees in October 1992, prompted by a $5 million loss in profit amid fierce price war in the PC industry ushered in by Compaq. Reply surveyed their customers as to how the company should reinvent itself and decided to phase out manufacturing complete machines, instead releasing upgrade motherboards for existing IBM PS/2s. These motherboards, which Reply marketed as the TurboProcessor System Upgrade (later as the PowerBoard), were released starting in December 1992, allowing modern processors such as IBM's own 386SLC and Intel's i486DX2 to be installed in late-1980s-issue PS/2s, of which three to four million were estimated to be still in regular use in large companies. The upgrade motherboards also allowed these PS/2s, which normally supported ESDI drives only, to support PATA drives, which were plentiful compared to the former owing to their use in almost all IBM PC-compatible systems of the day. Also in December, Reply released their last complete computer, the Model 16 486SLC2, featuring IBM's 486SLC2 clocked at 40 MHz, upgradable to Intel's i486SX2 at 50 MHz.

In April 1993, IBM signed a deal with Reply to resell the latter's TurboProcessor Upgrade cards under IBM's branding. Later that year, Reply ventured into designing computers for other companies, engineering the motherboard for IBM's PS/2 Model 53 SLC2, as well as designing another MCA computer from the ground up for Olivetti. The company also announced several MCA expansion cards, including graphics and sound upgrades and an IDE drive adapter. In addition, they teased a PowerPC upgrade board for the PS/2, spurred by developments in the contemporaneous alliance between Apple, Motorola and IBM. This came to fruition in 1994 as the MPC105, a PowerPC 603-powered motherboard with PCI and ISA slots which Reply manufactured, albeit ultimately not as a PS/2 upgrade.

By the end of 1993, Reply posed a profit of $3 million. Petracca was given $14 million in venture capital by five backers some years back to fund Reply's growth, but by August 1994 the capital had run dry. Petracca turned to a private equity firm in an attempt to make the company more profitable.

Reply branched out from releasing upgrade motherboards for IBM exclusively with the release of the Deskpro PowerBoard. Released in December 1994, these boards were designed for Compaq Deskpros with 286 and 386 processors, allowing them to be fitted with the i486SX2 up to the DX4, as well as having Pentium OverDrive sockets. The company followed this up with upgrade boards for Compaq's ProLinea machines in 1995, as well as boards for IBM's PS/1s and PS/ValuePoints. According to Ward's, Reply had by 1995 recovered their original workforce of 100 employees. In December that year, Reply released the DOS on Mac expansion card for Apple's Power Macintosh 8100, allowing it to run MS-DOS and Windows applications off a Cyrix 5x86 or an Intel DX4. In 1996, they released an update to these cards for Macintosh computers featuring Intel Pentium processors clocked at 166 MHz to 200 MHz.

=== Acquisition ===
By 1997, Reply was down to 25 employees, for reasons unclear. In April that year, Reply sold their DOS on Mac technology to Radius, a hardware company based in Sunnyvale, California. This sale and the loss of Reply's employees put the company's longevity into question. Reply's remaining 25 employees were moved into Radius's office in Sunnyvale, with ten leading engineers including Petracca securing permanent positions within Radius. Radius acquired Reply outright later that year.

== Products ==
=== Computers ===
Model	Processor	Clock speed (MHz)	L2 cache (KB)	HDD	Stock memory	Max. memory (MB)	Form factor	Date introduced	Ref(s).
286/16	Intel 80286	16	0	30 MB or 60 MB or 120 MB (EDSI)	2	8	Desktop	November 1989	
286/20	Intel 80286	20	0	30 MB or 60 MB or 120 MB (EDSI)	2	8	Desktop	November 1989	
386SX/16	Intel 80386SX	16	0	30 MB or 60 MB or 120 MB (EDSI)	2	8	Desktop	March 1990	
386SX/20	Intel 80386SX	20	0	30 MB or 60 MB or 120 MB (EDSI)	2	16	Desktop	March 1990	
Model 16	Intel 80286 or Intel 80386SX	16 or 20	0	30 MB or 60 MB or 120 MB or 325 MB (EDSI)	8	8	Small form factor desktop	March 1990	
Model 16 386SLC	IBM 386SLC	20	0	120 MB	4	8	Small form factor desktop	August 1992	
Model 16 486SLC2	IBM 486SLC2	40	0	120 MB	4	16	Small form factor desktop	December 1992	
Model 32	Intel 80386DX or Intel 80486SX or Intel 80486DX	25–33 (386DX) or 20 (486SX) or 25–50 (486DX)	64 (386DX at 25 MHz) or 128 (386DX at 33 MHz)	40 MB – 1.2 GB (EDSI)	4–16	32 (64 with adapter)	Small form factor desktop	November 1990	

=== Motherboards ===
Name	Compatible computer(s)	Processor(s) supported	Max. memory (MB)	Other features	Date introduced	Ref(s).
PS/2 Model 25 TurboProcessor	IBM PS/2 Model 25	Intel 80486SX	32	GPU with 512 KB of video memory, IDE and ST506 hard drive interface on-board	June 1994	
PS/2 Model 30 TurboProcessor	IBM PS/2 Model 30	Intel 80486SX	32	GPU with 512 KB of video memory, IDE and ST506 hard drive interface on-board	June 1994	
PS/2 Model 50/50Z TurboProcessor	IBM PS/2 Model 50, Model 50 Z	IBM 386SLC, IBM 486SLC	16	Super VGA GPU, IDE and EDSI hard drive interface on-board	February 1993	
PS/2 Model 55SX TurboProcessor	IBM PS/2 Model 55 SX	IBM 486SLC	16		February 1993	
PS/2 Model 70 TurboProcessor	IBM PS/2 Model 70	Intel 80486SX, Intel 80486DX2, Pentium Overdrive; IBM 486BL (late models)		Super VGA GPU, IDE drive	July 1993	
PS/2 Model 70 16-bit TurboProcessor	IBM PS/2 Model 70	IBM 486SLC2		GPU with 1 MB of video RAM, IDE hard drive interface on-board	October 1994	
PS/2 Model 60/65/80 TurboProcessor	IBM PS/2 Model 60, Model 65 SX, Model 80	Intel 80486SX, Intel 80486DX2, Pentium Overdrive; IBM 486BL (late models)	128	Super VGA GPU, IDE hard drive interface on-board, 80487 co-processor socket	July 1993	
PS/2 Model 25 PowerBoard	IBM PS/2 Model 25	Cyrix Cx486DX2, Intel 80486DX2, Intel 80486DX4	32	IDE hard drive interface on-board		
PS/2 Model 30 PowerBoard	IBM PS/2 Model 30	Cyrix Cx486DX2, Intel 80486DX2, Intel 80486DX4	32	IDE hard drive interface on-board		
PS/2 Model 50/50Z PowerBoard	IBM PS/2 Model 50, Model 50 Z	Intel 80486DX2, Intel 80486DX4	64	IDE and SCSI hard drive interface on-board	August 1994	
PS/2 Model 55SX PowerBoard	IBM PS/2 Model 55 SX	Intel 80486DX2, Intel 80486DX4	64	IDE and SCSI hard drive interface on-board	July 1994	
PS/2 Model 56/57/76/77 PowerBoard	IBM PS/2 Model 56, Model 57, Model 76, Model 77	Intel 80486DX, Intel 80486DX2, Intel 80486DX4		GPU with 1 MB of video RAM, IDE hard drive interface on-board	October 1994	
PS/2 Model 60/65/80 PowerBoard	IBM PS/2 Model 60, Model 65 SX, Model 80	Intel 80486DX4 (up to), Pentium OverDrive	64	64-bit local-bus SVGA GPU with GUI accelerator, enhanced IDE hard drive interface on-board	March 1995	
PS/2 Model 70 PowerBoard	IBM PS/2 Model 70	Intel 80486DX2, Intel 80486DX4	64	IDE and SCSI hard drive interface on-board	June 1994	
Deskpro PowerBoard	Compaq Deskpro E series and S series	Intel 80486SX2, Intel 80486DX2, Intel 80486DX4	64	PCI expansion slots	December 1994	
Pentathlon/PCI	IBM PS/1, IBM PS/ValuePoint, Compaq ProLinea	Intel Pentium	128	Phoenix BIOS	March 1995	

=== Expansion cards ===
- Token Ring Adapter/A
- MicroChannel Video Adapter
- MicroChannel Sound Card with SCSI
- MicroChannel Sound Card without SCSI
- DOS on Mac

== See also ==
- Aox Inc., another manufacturer of expansion cards and peripherals for the PS/2
