= IBM PS/2 Model 80 =

1987 IBM desktop computer

Personal System/2 Model 80

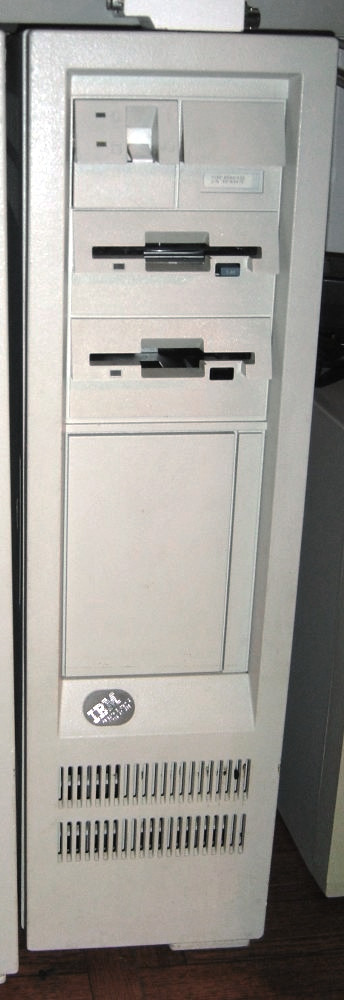
- A PS/2 Model 80 with dual floppy drives
- Developer: International Business Machines Corporation (IBM)
- Manufacturer: IBM
- Product family: Personal System/2
- Type: Personal computer
- Released: April 2, 1987; 38 years ago
- Availability: July 1987
- Lifespan: 1987–1992
- Discontinued: 1992
- Media: 1.44 MB 3.5-in floppy disks
- CPU: Intel 386 at 16–25 MHz
- Storage: 44–320 MB hard drive
- Graphics: Video Graphics Array
- Power: 120/240 VAC ～
- Predecessor: Personal Computer/AT
- Related: List of IBM PS/2 models

The Personal System/2 Model 80 (typeset on the badge as the Personal System/2 Model 80 386) is a high-end desktop computer in IBM's Personal System/2 (PS/2) family of personal computers. First released in July 1987, the Model 80 features the 32-bit Intel 386 processor running at a clock speed of 16 MHz. The Model 80 was built into a tower case, the same one as its 16-bit counterpart the PS/2 Model 60. It has several 32-bit MCA expansion slots—the only PS/2 model to include such slots at the time of its release—and between five and six drive bays. The PS/2 Model 80 was the highest-end PS/2 in the original 1987 line-up and was IBM's first PC based on the 386 processor. The Model 80 received several updates over the course of its lifespan, increasing the computer's hard drive capacity as well as the clock speed of its processor and the maximum supported RAM. IBM discontinued the Model 80 in 1992.

== Development and release ==
IBM announced the PS/2 Model 80 on April 2, 1987, alongside the entire Personal System/2 line, which represented IBM's second generation of personal desktop computers after the original IBM PC was launched in 1981. The original PS/2 line-up included the low-end PS/2 Model 30, the midrange PS/2 Model 50, the higher-end PS/2 Model 60, and the highest-end Model 80. All but the Model 80 were available to buy immediately that April; the first units of the PS/2 Model 80 were slated for a late 1987 release, but owing to delays in shipping the Model 60 in mass volume, the Model 80's release date was moved up to early July 1987 to fulfill demand.

The chief engineer behind the Model 80 was Mark Dean, who previously headed development of the PC AT and the ISA bus. The Model 80 was initially manufactured at IBM's facility in Boca Raton, Florida, along with the Model 30, Model 50, and Model 80. In early 1989, IBM moved manufacturing of PS/2s from Boca Raton to Raleigh, North Carolina, after having shut down their production lines reserved for computer systems in Florida to make way for other products. The new production lines in Raleigh featured a greater degree of factory automation, intended to hasten the production of computers. Significant defects engendered by this new machinery led to shortages of the Model 80 in 1989, however, which was then in high demand amid growing commercial interest in local area networking (LAN).

== Specifications ==
The PS/2 Model 80 was IBM's first personal computer to feature the 32-bit Intel 80386 processor. It was not, however, the first IBM PC–derived computer system to feature a 386 processor; that distinction belongs to Compaq's Deskpro 386, released in September 1986. The Deskpro 386 was the first implementation of the 80386 processor in a computer system for sale to the public, bringing the PC platform into the 32-bit era and earning Compaq a reputation as a standards-setter for IBM PC compatibility, rather than merely a follower of IBM's lead. InfoWorld ran the headline on the cover page of their September 15, 1986, issue: "Compaq Introduces 386 PC, Challenges IBM to Match It". In the article, Rod Canion, Compaq's CEO, was quoted warning IBM that they had six months to respond with a 386-based machine of their own lest they lose serious market share. IBM envisioned the Model 80 as the premier machine for their forthcoming multi-user Operating System/2 (OS/2), co-developed by Microsoft and ultimately a market failure.

As well as being IBM's first 386-based PC, the Model 80 was the company's second Intel-powered PC built into a tower case. The case was identical to the Model 60—IBM's first Intel-based tower computer—down to the carrying handle included on top of the machine, to aid in lifting the relatively heavy computer, at roughly 40 pounds (18 kg).

The Model 80 features eight Micro Channel expansion slots: four 16-bit slots, one 16-bit slot with an extension exclusively meant for select graphics adapter cards, and three 32-bit slots. The Model 80 was the only entry in the initial PS/2 line-up to sport 32-bit Micro Channel slots, until the release of the PS/2 Model 70, which was essentially a compact version of the Model 80 built into the PS/2 Model 50's chassis. Besides the expansion slots, the Model 80 features several drive bays: two accommodating 3.5-inch-width drives (one 3.5-inch floppy drive is included as stock; the 3.5-inch drive bays may also house tape drives and the like); and up to three aftermarket 5.25-inch drives (for floppy drives, optical drives, hard drive, and the like). Owing to the relatively narrow case of the Model 80, the 5.25-inch drives must be mounted on their sides, 90 degrees counterclockwise.

The original PS/2 Model 80s came in two configurations: the Model 80-041, featuring a ST-506–based 44-MB hard disk drive; and the Model 80-071, featuring a faster, ESDI-based 70-MB hard disk drive. Both of these submodels ran the 386 at a clock speed of 16 MHz (equivalent to the original Deskpro 386). IBM planned to beat Compaq to the punch with a faster, 20-MHz version of the Model 80 in late 1987, with the Model 80-111, also featuring an ESDI-based 115-MB hard drive. Compaq thwarted IBM's plans again by releasing the Deskpro 386/20 in September 1987, ahead of the Model 80-111's November 1987 release date. The Model 80-111 featured a substantially redesigned system board ("planar", in IBM parlance) in order to accommodate a boost in the clock speed as well as the maximum amount of RAM. IBM released the follow-up Model 80–311 in January 1988, featuring a 20-MHz 386 processor and a 314 MB ESDI hard drive.

In March 1990, IBM released three new submodels of the PS/2 Model 80, intended as low-cost file servers. These new submodels boosted the clock speed to 25 MHz and included SCSI hard drives and host adapters built-in. At the low-end of the new line-up was the Model 80-121, featuring a 120-MB hard drive and a 25-MHz 386 processor; and the Model 80-A21, with a 120-MB hard drive and a 25-MHz 386. At the high-end was the Model 80-321, which featured a 320-MB hard drive exclusive to the machine. In October 1990, the Model 80 received three final updates, in the form of the Model 80–081 with a 20-MHz 386 and an 80-MB SCSI hard drive; the Model 80–161 with a 20-MHZ 386 and a 160-MB hard drive; and the Model 80-A16 with a 25-MHz 386 and a 160-MB SCSI hard drive. After extensive price cuts to the remaining models, IBM officially discontinued the Model 80 in 1992. The company named the PS/2 Server 85, introduced that year, as its replacement.

== Sales ==
The Model 80 performed mediocrely in the market at first, IBM shipping roughly 100,000 units between July 1987 and January 1988, according to Gartner Dataquest. It consistently trailed behind Compaq, whose Deskpro 386 line cornered more than 70 percent of the 386 workstation market, the company selling 76,000 units of the Deskpro 386/20 submodel alone in 1987. Reasons for the Model 80's disappointing sales included its high cost, a lack of third-party 32-bit expansion cards, and skepticism over the future of Micro Channel. Dataquest projected only 160,000 unit sales of the Model 80 for 1988, compared to 650,000 for the Model 50 and 215,000 for the Model 60. After a brief wave of rejuvenated interest due to the growing market for LAN products in early 1989, the Model 80 went back to underperforming, accounting for less than 7 percent of all PS/2 sales between the middle of 1989 and the beginning of 1990. The only model of PS/2 that performed more poorly during this period was the Model 60, which was discontinued that year.

== Reception ==
Initial reviews of the Model 80 were cautiously optimistic. PC Tech Journal's Steven Armburst and Caroline Halliday, in a joint longform review, concluded that the release of IBM's OS/2 operating system could justify the high cost of the Model 80: "This is a machine with outstanding potential for the future that delivers top-quality performance today. When OS/2 finally arrives, it will be better able to take advantage of the power of the Model 80's 80386. Looking ahead even farther, an operating system that takes full advantage of this microprocessor could make the IBM PS/2 Model 80 an even better investment". Multiple reviewers found that the Model 80 underperformed in raw numerical performance and graphical speed compared to contemporaneous 386-powered machines, across all clock speeds.

== Legacy ==
Although it underperformed in the marketplace, the PS/2 Model 80 (as well as the Model 60) started the trend of computer manufacturers offering PC compatibles in optional tower form factors. By May 1988, over a dozen companies were selling desktops in a tower form factor at that year's Comdex, according to The New York Times. By the mid-1990s, tower computers had overtaken traditional horizontal desktop cases in terms of sales.

== Submodels ==
IBM PS/2 Model 80 submodels
Model	IBM P/N	Processor	Clock speed (MHz)	Bus	No. of slots	No. of drive bays	FDD	HDD	Stock RAM	Maximum RAM	Video adapter	Monitor	Form factor	Date introduced	Notes	Ref(s).
80	8580-041	Intel 386	16	MCA, 32-bit	8	5/6	one 1.44 MB	44 MB (ST-506)	1 MB	2 MB	VGA	optional	Tower	July 1987		
80	8580-071	Intel 386	16	MCA, 32-bit	8	5/6	one 1.44 MB	70 MB (ESDI)	1 MB	2 MB	VGA	optional	Tower	July 1987		
80	8580-081	Intel 386	20	MCA, 32-bit	8	5/6	one 1.44 MB	80 MB (SCSI)	2 MB	4 MB	VGA	optional	Tower	October 1990		
80	8580-111	Intel 386	20	MCA, 32-bit	8	5/6	one 1.44 MB	115 MB (ESDI)	2 MB	4 MB	VGA	optional	Tower	November 1987		
80	8580-121	Intel 386	20	MCA, 32-bit	8	5/6	one 1.44 MB	120 MB (SCSI)	2 MB	4 MB	VGA	optional	Tower	March 1990		
80	8580-161	Intel 386	20	MCA, 32-bit	8	5/6	one 1.44 MB	160 MB (SCSI)	2 MB	4 MB	VGA	optional	Tower	October 1990		
80	8580-311	Intel 386	20	MCA, 32-bit	8	5/6	one 1.44 MB	314 MB (ESDI)	2 MB	4 MB	VGA	optional	Tower	January 1988		
80	8580-321	Intel 386	20	MCA, 32-bit	8	5/6	one 1.44 MB	320 MB (SCSI)	2 MB	4 MB	VGA	optional	Tower	March 1990		
80	8580-A16	Intel 386	25	MCA, 32-bit	8	5/6	one 1.44 MB	160 MB (SCSI)	4 MB	8 MB	VGA	optional	Tower	October 1990		
80	8580-A21	Intel 386	25	MCA, 32-bit	8	5/6	one 1.44 MB	120 MB (SCSI)	4 MB	8 MB	VGA	optional	Tower	March 1990		
80	8580-A31	Intel 386	25	MCA, 32-bit	8	5/6	one 1.44 MB	320 MB (SCSI)	4 MB	8 MB	VGA	optional	Tower	March 1990		
