= P75 =

P75 may refer to:

- Boulton Paul P.75 Overstrand, a British bomber aircraft
- Fisher P-75 Eagle, an American fighter aircraft design
- INS Amini (P75), ships of the Indian Navy
- BRM P75, a Formula One engine
- FB P-75, a pistol
- IBM PS/2 P75, a portable computer
- p75 neurotrophin receptor
- Papyrus 75, an early Greek New Testament manuscript
- P75, a state regional road in Latvia
