= IBM PS/2 Model 70 =

1988 IBM desktop computer

Personal System/2 Model 70 386; Personal System/2 Model 70 486

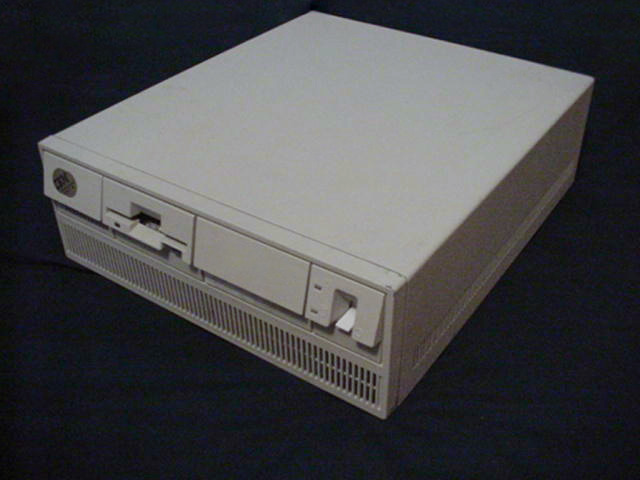
- A PS/2 Model 70 386, with one floppy drive and one hard drive
- Developer: International Business Machines Corporation (IBM)
- Manufacturer: IBM
- Product family: Personal System/2
- Type: Personal computer
- Released: June 2, 1988; 38 years ago (Model 70 386); December 19, 1989 (Model 70 486)
- Lifespan: 1988–1992
- Discontinued: December 1992
- Media: 1.44 MB 3.5-in floppy disks
- CPU: Intel 386 at 16–25 MHz (Model 70 386); Intel 486 at 25 MHz (Model 70 486)
- Storage: 60–160 MB hard drive
- Graphics: Video Graphics Array
- Power: 120/240 VAC ～
- Successor: PS/2 Model 76; PS/2 Model 77
- Related: List of IBM PS/2 models

The Personal System/2 Model 70 386 and Personal System/2 Model 70 486 are midrange desktop computers in IBM's Personal System/2 (PS/2) family of personal computers. The PS/2 Model 70 386, released in June 1988, features an Intel 386 microprocessor clocked between 16 MHz and 25 MHz (depending on the submodel) and features the 32-bit Micro Channel architecture (MCA) bus; the Model 70 486, released in December 1989, features the Intel 486 clocked at 25 MHz and also includes the 32-bit MCA bus. The latter is essentially a Model 70 386 with the 486/25 Power Platform pre-installed; this was a CPU upgrade card for the Model 70 386 released earlier in October 1989 that was the first commercially available product to use the 486 processor. Both editions of Model 70 are housed in the same case as the earlier PS/2 Model 50 from 1987.

The PS/2 Model 70 was succeeded in 1992 by the similarly sized Personal System/2 Model 76 and the larger Personal System/2 Model 77. Like the Model 70 before them, both are desktop models featuring 32-bit Micro Channel expansion slots.

== Development and release ==
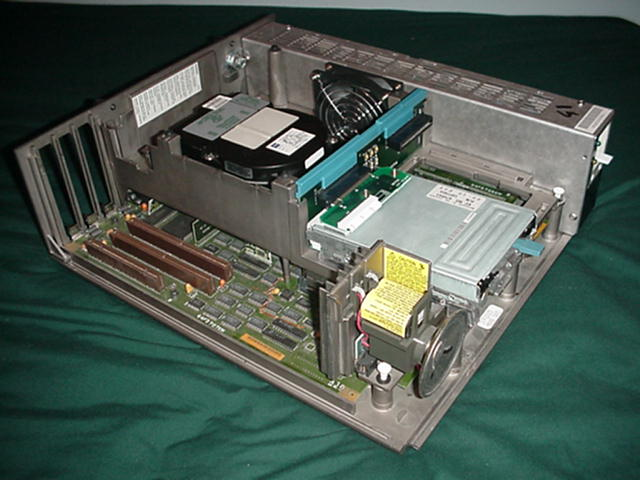
The PS/2 Model 70 borrows the chassis of the PS/2 Model 50 and features the same tool-less construction.

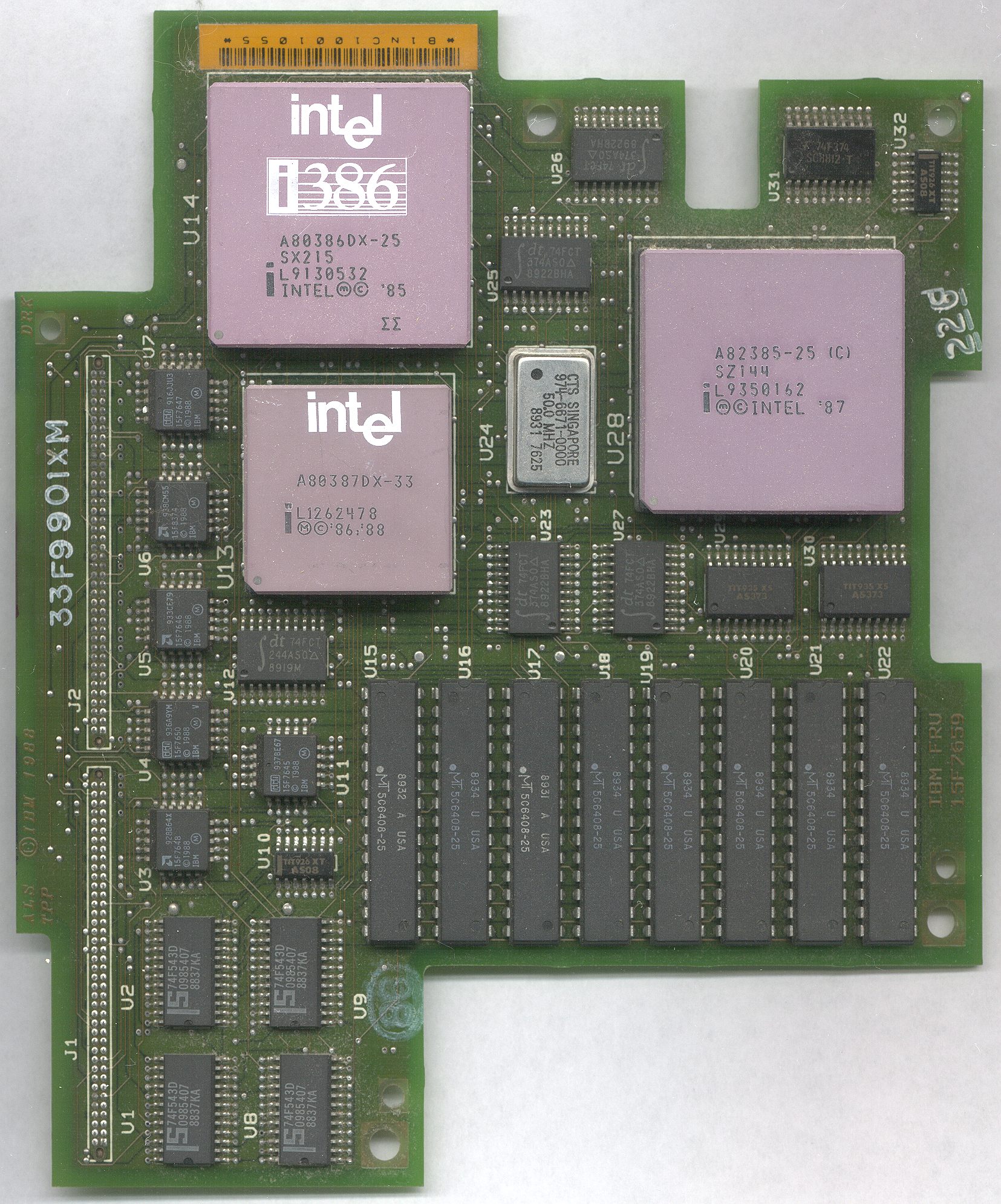
The 25-MHz Intel 386 processor complex from a Model 70 386-A21. This complex also has an 80387 floating point unit installed.

Both variants of the Model 70, along with the rest of the PS/2 line, were developed at IBM's facility in Boca Raton, Florida. The original Model 70 386 was released on June 2, 1988. The chief engineer behind the Model 70 386 was Mark Dean, who previously headed development of the PS/2 Model 80, the PC AT and the ISA bus. The original Personal System/2 Model 70 386 was in development at IBM since 1986, along with the rest of the initial line-up of the PS/2. The existence of prototypes of the Model 70 386 were known to select members of the press and industry insiders since April 1987, but it took until May 1988 for IBM to formally announce it. In the interim, IBM released the PS/2 Model 80—the company's first Intel-based PC with the 32-bit 386 microprocessor. With its tower construction allowing for a greater number of Micro Channel expansion slots and drive bays IBM initially positioned the PS/2 Model 80 as a multiuser workstation. However, the company pivoted the machine toward server use the next year, with the Model 70 386 slotting into the role of a 32-bit workstation.

Both the Model 70 and the Model 50 Z, introduced on the same day, served as the market introduction of the 72-pin SIMM form factor for RAM modules. These replaced the 30-pin SIMMs of older models and had the advantage of having a 32-bit data path, allowing modules to be installed individually in a 32-bit system (such as a 386) whereas 30-pin SIMMs required installing in groups of four in a 32-bit system owing to their 8-bit data path. The 72-pin SIMM quickly became a de facto industry standard for RAM modules and was in widespread use in PCs until the development of DIMMs in the mid-1990s.

Both the Model 70 386 and the Model 70 486 feature the same case and tool-less construction as the Model 50 released earlier in April 1987. The Model 70 386 was initially manufactured at IBM's facility in Boca Raton, Florida, along with the Model 50, the Model 30, the Model 60, and the Model 80. In early 1989, IBM moved manufacturing of PS/2s from Boca Raton to Raleigh, North Carolina, after having shut down their production lines reserved for computer systems in Florida to make way for other products. The hard drives used in the Model 70s were manufactured at IBM Japan's plant in Fujisawa, Kanagawa.

The Model 70 386 was plagued with several design defects from the time of its release. The Model 70 386-A21 in particular was problematic, with initial production runs possessing a defective processor complex slot that prevented the systems from functioning. These issues and more prompted suspension of production as well as numerous motherboard redesigns lasting two months in early 1989. In June 1989, IBM issued a recall of certain submodels of the Model 70 386 possessing 120-MB hard drives, after users reported drive failures and a "10483" error code shortly after purchase. These failures were traced back to a manufacturing error at IBM Fujisawa; the fault was discovered to be oil lubricant breaching containment and leaking outside of the drives. While this leak was easily fixed and did not result in any data loss, it resulted in the recall of 25,000 units of the Model 70 386 that month.

=== 486/25 Power Platform ===
In June 1989, IBM announced the 486/25 Power Platform. This was an upgrade package for the Model 70 386-A21 (see § Specifications for more details on the submodel) comprising a 25-MHz Intel 486 microprocessor on a CPU daughtercard (called a complex, in IBM parlance). This card plugs into a dedicated slot on the motherboard (a planar, in IBM parlance), replacing the 25-MHz 386 processor complex that the Model 70 386-A21 originally shipped with. This allows the Model 70 386 to run twice as fast as 386 machines clocked at 33 MHz, on top of giving the Model 70 386 the built-in floating point unit inherent to the i486. The 486/25 Power Platform was designed by a group of engineers led by David Bradley, one of the engineers of the original IBM PC. It was the first commercially available product to use the 486 processor, announced just two months after Intel publicly released the 486 processor and first shipping in early October 1989. Less than a month later, however, a calculation bug was discovered in early batches of the 486 processor. While the bug was relatively minor and rarely encountered in real-world applications, IBM halted further shipments of the 486/25 Power Platform until December 1989, after Intel had corrected the bug in further batches of 486 processors. In the interim, Apricot Computers released the VX FT, the world's first pre-built 486 computer, in early December 1989. (Note: The first units of the VX FX were shipped in the first week of December 1989.) Like the Model 70 386, the VX FT featured the Micro Channel architecture.

On December 19, 1989, IBM introduced the PS/2 Model 70 486, their first prebuilt computer system with the 486 processor. In essence, the Model 70 486 is identical to the Model 70 386, only with the 486/25 Power Platform preinstalled and with a different badge on the front of the case. Select units of the Model 70 486 were shipped to enterprises in the third week of December 1989, while volume shipment was slated for mid-January 1990.

== Specifications ==
All submodels of Model 70 have three Micro Channel expansion slots: two 32-bit slots and one 16-bit slot. The 16-bit slot features an extension for specific MCA graphics adapters such as the 8514/A.

=== Model 70 386 ===
The initial two entries in the Model 70 386 line were released in June 1988 and comprise the Model 70 386-E61, with a 386 processor clocked at 16 MHz, and the Model 70-121, with the same processor clocked at 20 MHz. The Model 70 386-E61 features 1 MB of RAM stock and a 60-MB ESDI hard disk drive. The Model 70-121 doubles the capacity of both the stock amount of RAM and the hard drive capacity. Both units may have their RAM expanded up to 16 MB total; they additionally sport a socket for a 387 floating point unit. The top-of-the-line Model 70 386-A21 was released later, in December 1988 (delayed a month due to FCC Class B emissions testing). IBM designed this submodel with a significantly different motherboard, with the 25-MHz Intel 386 processor residing on a daughtercard that plugs into a dedicated slot on the motherboard. This opposed to having the 386 processor plug into a QFP, as is the case with the initial two entries in the Model 70 386 line. Besides housing the 386 processor, the daughtercard also has a socket for 387 math coprocessor and 64 KB worth of 30-ns SRAM acting as cache, driven by an Intel 82385 cache controller. The Model 70-A21 featured the same 120-MB ESDI hard drive as the Model 70-121.

In September 1989, IBM introduced two new models of the Model 70 386. The first was the Model 70-061, a 20-MHz 386 unit with a 60-MB hard drive intended as a low-cost version of the Model 70-121; and the second was the Model 70-A61, a cost-reduced version of the Model 70 386-A21 (featuring the same 25-MHz 386 on a complex) with the same 60-MB hard drive. After a two-year gap with no new introductions, IBM announced the final four models in the Model 70 386 range in December 1991. These included the Model 70 386-A81, a 25-MHz unit with an 80-MB hard drive; the Model 70 386-A16, another 25-MHz unit with a 160-MB hard drive; the Model 70 386–081, a 20-MHz unit with an 80-MB hard drive; and the Model 70 386–161, another 20-MHz unit with a 160 MB hard drive. All four models came with 4 MB of RAM stock. The PS/2 Model 70 386 was officially withdrawn by IBM in October 1992.

=== Model 70 486 ===
The Model 70 486 was introduced in December 1989 in two variants: the Model 70 486-B21, with a 120-MB ESDI hard drive, and the Model 70 486-B61, with a 60-MB ESDI hard drive. Both ran the Intel 486 processor at 25 MHz and were essentially rebadged variants of the Model 70-121 and Model 70–061 with the 486/25 Power Platform preinstalled. IBM withdrew the Model 70 486 after less than two years on the market, in June 1991.

== Portable model ==
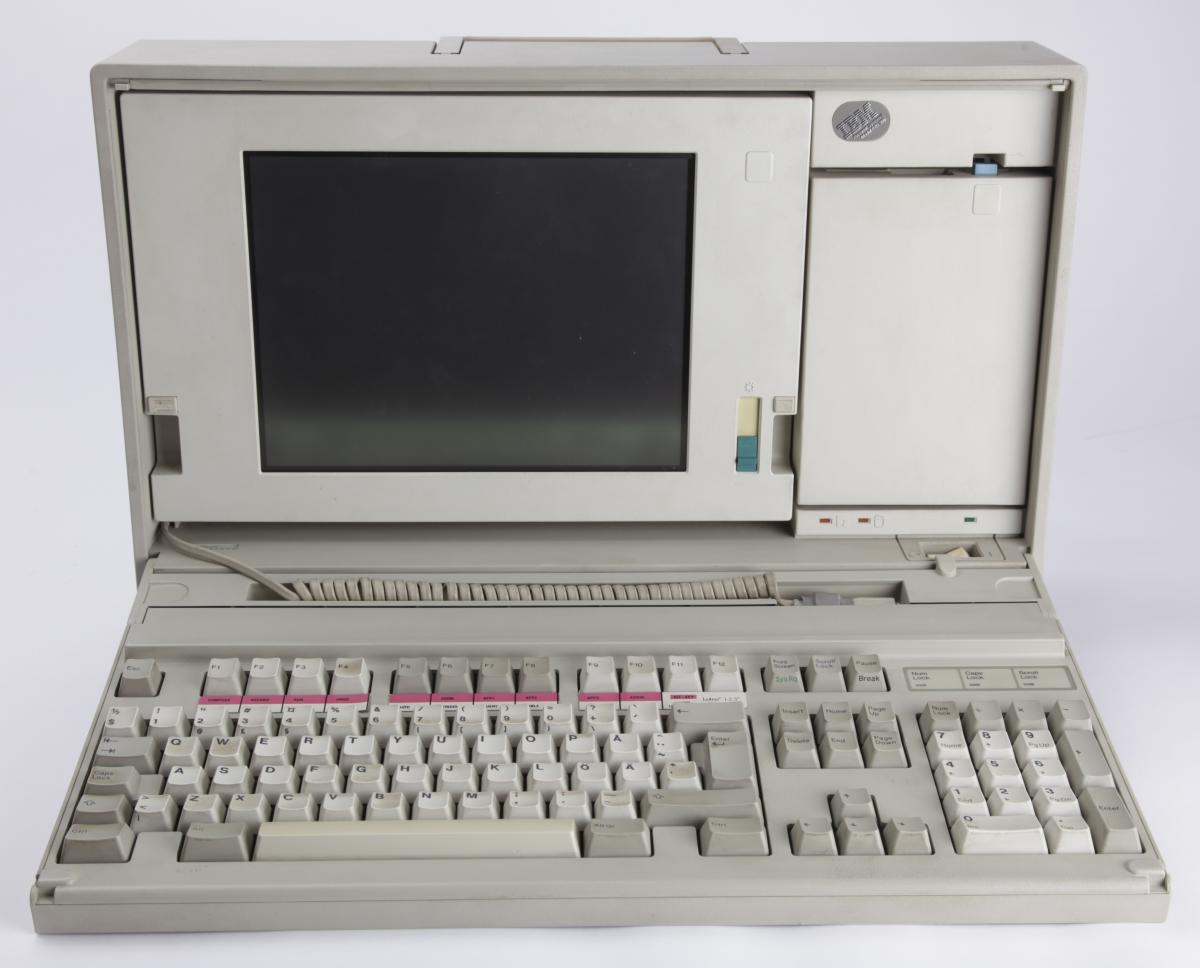
The PS/2 Model P70 was a portable version of the PS/2 Model 70 386.

In May 1989, IBM released the PS/2 Model P70, a portable version of the PS/2 Model 70 386 that weighed 21 pounds (9.5 kg) (the same as the Model 70 386 desktop) and had a carrying handle. It featured a 20-MHz Intel 386 processor, 4 MB of RAM stock, and a flat-panel, amber-tined, monochrome gas plasma display. It was IBM's third attempt at a portable PC in the United States, after the market failures that were the Portable PC and the PC Convertible.

== Reception ==
The PS/2 Model 70 386 received positive reviews in the press. InfoWorld's Stephen Satchell rated the Model 70 386-121 a "very good value" and assessed it as being faster than a PS/2 Model 80 with the same 20-MHz chip, despite the latter having a more complex construction and a considerably higher cost. Personal Computing's Christopher O'Malley found the Model 70 386-A21 the fastest 25-MHz 386 machine compared to competitors from Compaq and Advanced Logic Research but criticized the limited avenues for upgrading the hard drive, on account of the more-proprietary ESDI interface that the PS/2 used. Multiple reviewers for InfoWorld rated the Model 70 386-A21 a good value for technical applications (particularly CAD/CAM) but poorly as a file server. Bruce Brown in PC Magazine concluded: "IBM's PS/2 Model 70s combine small size, impressive modular design, and gobs of power in three pricey computers. You can't expand these computers much, but they come fully equipped anyway."

== Submodels ==
IBM PS/2 Model 70 submodels
Model	IBM P/N	Processor	Clock speed (MHz)	Bus	No. of slots	No. of drive bays	FDD	HDD	Stock RAM	Maximum RAM	Video adapter	Monitor	Form factor	Date introduced	Notes	Ref(s).
70 386	8570-061	Intel 386	20	MCA, 32-bit	3	3	one 1.44 MB	60 MB (ESDI)	2 MB	6 MB	VGA	optional	Desktop	September 1989		
70 386	8570-081	Intel 386	20	MCA, 32-bit	3	3	one 1.44 MB	60 MB (ESDI)	4 MB	6 MB	VGA	optional	Desktop	June 1991		
70 386	8570-121	Intel 386	20	MCA, 32-bit	3	3	one 1.44 MB	120 MB (ESDI)	2 MB	6 MB	VGA	optional	Desktop	June 1988		
70 386	8570-161	Intel 386	20	MCA, 32-bit	3	3	one 1.44 MB	160 MB (ESDI)	4 MB	6 MB	VGA	optional	Desktop	June 1991		
70 386	8570-A16	Intel 386	25	MCA, 32-bit	3	3	one 1.44 MB	160 MB (ESDI)	4 MB	6 MB	VGA	optional	Desktop	June 1991		
70 386	8570-A21	Intel 386	25	MCA, 32-bit	3	3	one 1.44 MB	120 MB (ESDI)	2 MB	6 MB	VGA	optional	Desktop	December 1988		
70 386	8570-A61	Intel 386	25	MCA, 32-bit	3	3	one 1.44 MB	60 MB (ESDI)	2 MB	6 MB	VGA	optional	Desktop	September 1989		
70 386	8570-A81	Intel 386	25	MCA, 32-bit	3	3	one 1.44 MB	80 MB (ESDI)	4 MB	6 MB	VGA	optional	Desktop	June 1991		
70 386	8570-E61	Intel 386	16	MCA, 32-bit	3	3	one 1.44 MB	60 MB (ESDI)	1 MB	6 MB	VGA	optional	Desktop	June 1988		
70 486	8570-B21	Intel 486	25	MCA, 32-bit	3	3	one 1.44 MB	120 MB (ESDI)	2 MB	8 MB	VGA	optional	Desktop	December 1989		
70 486	8570-B61	Intel 486	25	MCA, 32-bit	3	3	one 1.44 MB	60 MB (ESDI)	2 MB	8 MB	VGA	optional	Desktop	December 1989		

== Successor models ==
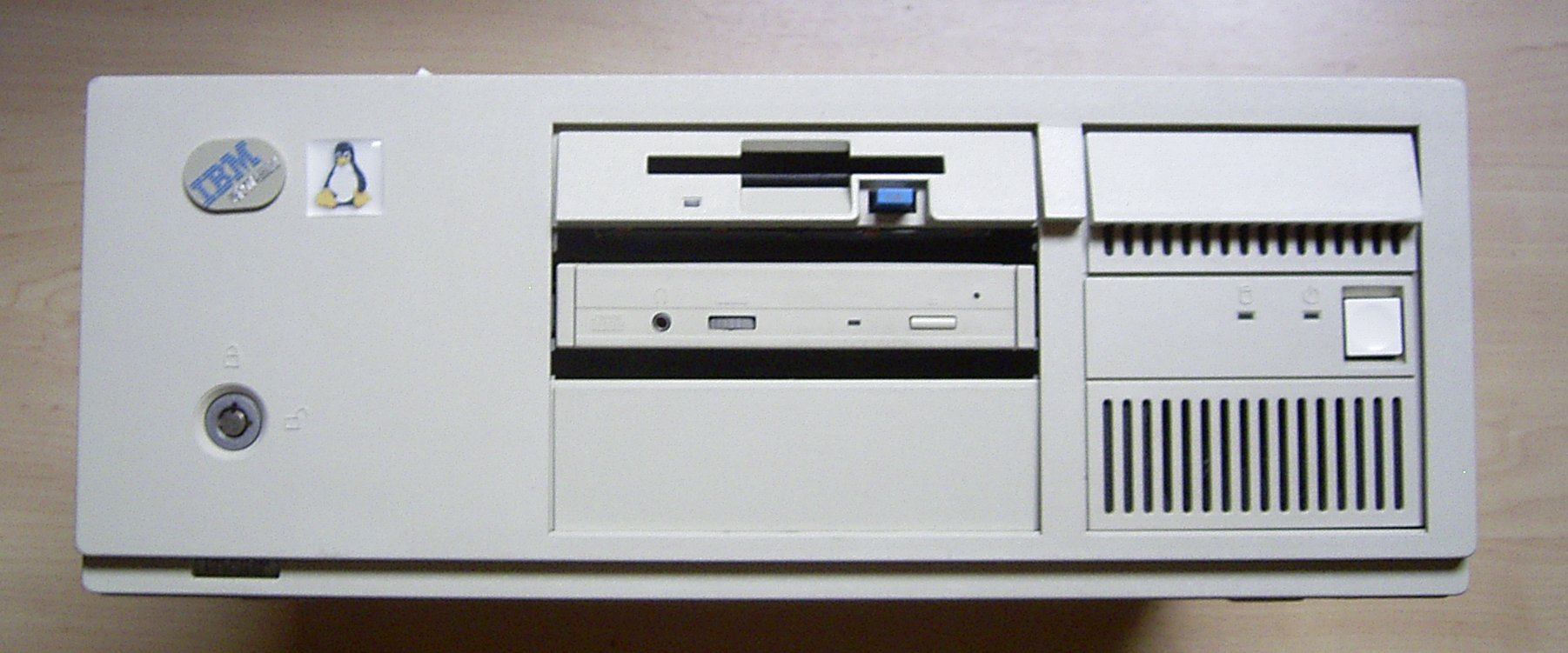
A PS/2 Model 77 with an aftermarket CD-ROM drive installed

The PS/2 Model 70 was succeeded by two successor subfamilies: the PS/2 Model 76 and the PS/2 Model 77. Both featured redesigned cases and faster and more advanced processors. Submodels in the Model 76 range had three 32-bit Micro Channel processor slots and three 3.5-inch drive bays, while submodels in the Model 77 range had five 32-bit Micro Channel processors lots and four drive bays.

=== Model 76 ===
IBM PS/2 Model 76 submodels
Model	IBM P/N	Processor	Clock speed (MHz)	Bus	No. of slots	No. of drive bays	FDD	HDD	Stock RAM	Maximum RAM	Video adapter	Monitor	Form factor	Date introduced	Notes	Ref(s).
76 486	9576-0U6	Intel 486SX	33	MCA, 32-bit	3	3	one 2.88 MB	104 MB (SCSI)	8 MB	32 MB	XGA-2	optional	Desktop	September 1992		
76 486	9576-0UA	Intel 486SX	33	MCA, 32-bit	3	3	one 2.88 MB	212 MB (SCSI)	8 MB	32 MB	XGA-2	optional	Desktop	September 1992		
76 486	9576-DU6	Intel 486SX	33	MCA, 32-bit	3	3	one 2.88 MB	104 MB (SCSI)	8 MB	32 MB	XGA-2	optional	Desktop	August 1993		
76 486	9576-DUA	Intel 486SX	33	MCA, 32-bit	3	3	one 2.88 MB	212 MB (SCSI)	8 MB	32 MB	XGA-2	optional	Desktop	August 1993		
76 486	9576-KU6	Intel 486SX	33	MCA, 32-bit	3	3	one 2.88 MB	104 MB (SCSI)	8 MB	32 MB	XGA-2	optional	Desktop	May 1993		
76 486	9576-KUA	Intel 486SX	33	MCA, 32-bit	3	3	one 2.88 MB	212 MB (SCSI)	8 MB	32 MB	XGA-2	optional	Desktop	May 1993		
76 486	9576-QU6	Intel 486SX	33	MCA, 32-bit	3	3	one 2.88 MB	104 MB (SCSI)	8 MB	32 MB	XGA-2	optional	Desktop	May 1993		
76 486	9576-QUA	Intel 486SX	33	MCA, 32-bit	3	3	one 2.88 MB	212 MB (SCSI)	8 MB	32 MB	XGA-2	optional	Desktop	May 1993		
76i	9576-ANB	Intel 486DX2	66	MCA, 32-bit	3	3	one 2.88 MB	270 MB (SCSI)	8 MB	64 MB	XGA-2	optional	Desktop	June 1994	IDE	
76i	9576-ATB	Intel 486DX4	100	MCA, 32-bit	3	3	one 2.88 MB	270 MB (SCSI)	8 MB	64 MB	XGA-2	optional	Desktop	June 1994	IDE	
76i	9576-AU9	Intel 486SX	33	MCA, 32-bit	3	3	one 2.88 MB	170 MB (SCSI)	8 MB	64 MB	XGA-2	optional	Desktop	June 1994	IDE	
76i	9576-AUB	Intel 486SX	33	MCA, 32-bit	3	3	one 2.88 MB	270 MB (SCSI)	8 MB	64 MB	XGA-2	optional	Desktop	June 1994	IDE	
76s	9576-BNB	Intel 486DX2	66	MCA, 32-bit	3	3	one 2.88 MB	270 MB (SCSI)	8 MB	64 MB	XGA-2	optional	Desktop	June 1994	SCSI	
76s	9576-BTB	Intel 486DX4	100	MCA, 32-bit	3	3	one 2.88 MB	270 MB (SCSI)	8 MB	64 MB	XGA-2	optional	Desktop	June 1994	SCSI	
76s	9576-BUB	Intel 486SX	33	MCA, 32-bit	3	3	one 2.88 MB	270 MB (SCSI)	8 MB	64 MB	XGA-2	optional	Desktop	June 1994	SCSI	

=== Model 77 ===
IBM PS/2 Model 77 submodels
Model	IBM P/N	Processor	Clock speed (MHz)	Bus	No. of slots	No. of drive bays	FDD	HDD	Stock RAM	Maximum RAM	Video adapter	Monitor	Form factor	Date introduced	Notes	Ref(s).
77 486	9577-0UA	Intel 486SX	33	MCA, 32-bit	5	4	one 2.88 MB	400 MB (SCSI)	8 MB	32 MB	XGA-2	optional	Desktop	October 1992		
77 486	9577-0UF	Intel 486SX	33	MCA, 32-bit	5	4	one 2.88 MB	212 MB (SCSI)	8 MB	32 MB	XGA-2	optional	Desktop	October 1992		
77 486	9577-DU6	Intel 486SX	33	MCA, 32-bit	5	4	one 2.88 MB	104 MB (SCSI)	8 MB	32 MB	XGA-2	optional	Desktop	Unknown		
77 486	9577-DUA	Intel 486SX	33	MCA, 32-bit	5	4	one 2.88 MB	212 MB (SCSI)	8 MB	32 MB	XGA-2	optional	Desktop	July 1993		
77 486	9577-DUG	Intel 486SX	33	MCA, 32-bit	5	4	one 2.88 MB	540 MB (SCSI)	8 MB	32 MB	XGA-2	optional	Desktop	July 1993		
77 486	9577-KUA	Intel 486SX	33	MCA, 32-bit	5	4	one 2.88 MB	212 MB (SCSI)	8 MB	32 MB	XGA-2	optional	Desktop	May 1993		
77 486	9577-KUF	Intel 486SX	33	MCA, 32-bit	5	4	one 2.88 MB	400 MB (SCSI)	8 MB	32 MB	XGA-2	optional	Desktop	May 1993		
77 486	9577-KUG	Intel 486SX	33	MCA, 32-bit	5	4	one 2.88 MB	540 MB (SCSI)	8 MB	32 MB	XGA-2	optional	Desktop	May 1993		
77 486	9577-QUA	Intel 486SX	33	MCA, 32-bit	5	4	one 2.88 MB	212 MB (SCSI)	8 MB	32 MB	XGA-2	optional	Desktop	May 1993		
77 486DX2	9577-0NA	Intel 486DX2	66	MCA, 32-bit	5	4	one 2.88 MB	212 MB (SCSI)	8 MB	32 MB	XGA-2	optional	Desktop	October 1992		
77 486DX2	9577-0NF	Intel 486DX2	66	MCA, 32-bit	5	4	one 2.88 MB	400 MB (SCSI)	8 MB	32 MB	XGA-2	optional	Desktop	October 1992		
77 486DX2	9577-DNA	Intel 486DX2	66	MCA, 32-bit	5	4	one 2.88 MB	212 MB (SCSI)	8 MB	32 MB	XGA-2	optional	Desktop	July 1993		
77 486DX2	9577-DNG	Intel 486DX2	66	MCA, 32-bit	5	4	one 2.88 MB	540 MB (SCSI)	8 MB	32 MB	XGA-2	optional	Desktop	July 1993		
77 486DX2	9577-KNA	Intel 486DX2	66	MCA, 32-bit	5	4	one 2.88 MB	212 MB (SCSI)	8 MB	32 MB	XGA-2	optional	Desktop	May 1993		
77 486DX2	9577-KNG	Intel 486DX2	66	MCA, 32-bit	5	4	one 2.88 MB	540 MB (SCSI)	8 MB	32 MB	XGA-2	optional	Desktop	May 1993		
77 486DX2	9577-QNA	Intel 486DX2	66	MCA, 32-bit	5	4	one 2.88 MB	212 MB (SCSI)	8 MB	32 MB	XGA-2	optional	Desktop	April 1993		
Ultimedia M77 486	9577-1UA	Intel 486SX	33	MCA, 32-bit	5	4	one 2.88 MB	212 MB (SCSI)	8 MB	32 MB	XGA-2	optional	Desktop	October 1992		
Ultimedia M77 486DX2	9577-1NA	Intel 486DX2	66	MCA, 32-bit	5	4	one 2.88 MB	212 MB (SCSI)	8 MB	32 MB	XGA-2	optional	Desktop	October 1992		
77i	9577-ANB	Intel 486DX2	66	MCA, 32-bit	5	4	one 2.88 MB	270 MB (IDE)	8 MB	64 MB	XGA-2	optional	Desktop	June 1994		
77i	9577-ANG	Intel 486DX2	66	MCA, 32-bit	5	4	one 2.88 MB	527 MB (IDE)	8 MB	64 MB	XGA-2	optional	Desktop	June 1994		
77i	9577-ATB	Intel 486DX4	100	MCA, 32-bit	5	4	one 2.88 MB	270 MB (IDE)	8 MB	64 MB	XGA-2	optional	Desktop	June 1994		
77i	9577-ATG	Intel 486DX4	100	MCA, 32-bit	5	4	one 2.88 MB	527 MB (IDE)	8 MB	64 MB	XGA-2	optional	Desktop	June 1994		
77i	9577-AUB	Intel 486SX	33	MCA, 32-bit	5	4	one 2.88 MB	270 MB (IDE)	8 MB	64 MB	XGA-2	optional	Desktop	June 1994		
77s	9577-BNB	Intel 486DX2	66	MCA, 32-bit	5	4	one 2.88 MB	270 MB (SCSI)	8 MB	64 MB	XGA-2	optional	Desktop	June 1994		
77s	9577-BNG	Intel 486DX2	66	MCA, 32-bit	5	4	one 2.88 MB	540 MB (SCSI)	8 MB	64 MB	XGA-2	optional	Desktop	June 1994		
77s	9577-BTB	Intel 486DX4	100	MCA, 32-bit	5	4	one 2.88 MB	270 MB (SCSI)	8 MB	64 MB	XGA-2	optional	Desktop	June 1994		
77s	9577-BTG	Intel 486DX4	100	MCA, 32-bit	5	4	one 2.88 MB	540 MB (SCSI)	8 MB	64 MB	XGA-2	optional	Desktop	June 1994		
77s	9577-BUB	Intel 486SX	33	MCA, 32-bit	5	4	one 2.88 MB	270 MB (SCSI)	8 MB	64 MB	XGA-2	optional	Desktop	June 1994		
77s	9577-xNB	Intel 486DX2	66	MCA, 32-bit	5	4	one 2.88 MB	270 MB (SCSI)	8 MB	64 MB	XGA-2	optional	Desktop	June 1994		
77s	9577-xNG	Intel 486DX2	66	MCA, 32-bit	5	4	one 2.88 MB	540 MB (SCSI)	8 MB	64 MB	XGA-2	optional	Desktop	June 1994		
77s	9577-xTG	Intel 486DX4	100	MCA, 32-bit	5	4	one 2.88 MB	540 MB (SCSI)	8 MB	64 MB	XGA-2	optional	Desktop	June 1994		
77s	9577-6NB	Intel 486DX2	66	MCA, 32-bit	5	4	one 2.88 MB	270 MB (SCSI)	8 MB	64 MB	S3 928	optional	Desktop	November 1994	Multimedia, Windows	
77s	9577-7NB	Intel 486DX2	66	MCA, 32-bit	5	4	one 2.88 MB	270 MB (SCSI)	8 MB	64 MB	S3 928	optional	Desktop	November 1994	Multimedia, OS/2	
77s	9577-6NG	Intel 486DX2	66	MCA, 32-bit	5	4	one 2.88 MB	540 MB (SCSI)	8 MB	64 MB	S3 928	optional	Desktop	November 1994	Multimedia, Windows	
77s	9577-7NG	Intel 486DX2	66	MCA, 32-bit	5	4	one 2.88 MB	540 MB (SCSI)	8 MB	64 MB	S3 928	optional	Desktop	November 1994	Multimedia, OS/2	
77s	9577-6TG	Intel 486DX2	66	MCA, 32-bit	5	4	one 2.88 MB	540 MB (SCSI)	8 MB	64 MB	S3 928	optional	Desktop	November 1994	Multimedia, Windows, max. 256-KB L2 cache	
77s	9577-7TG	Intel 486DX2	66	MCA, 32-bit	5	4	one 2.88 MB	540 MB (SCSI)	8 MB	64 MB	S3 928	optional	Desktop	November 1994	Multimedia, OS/2, max. 256-KB L2 cache	

== See also ==
- Tandy 5000 MC, the first PS/2 clone, modeled after the PS/2 Model 70
