= David Bradley (engineer) =

American academic and engineer

David J. Bradley (born 4 January 1949) is one of the twelve engineers who worked on the original IBM PC, developing the computer's ROM BIOS code. Bradley is credited for implementing the "Control-Alt-Delete" (Ctrl-Alt-Del) key combination that was used to reboot the computer. Bradley joined IBM in 1975 after earning his doctorate in electrical engineering from Purdue University with a dissertation on computer architectures.

== Education ==
Bachelors, Electrical Engineering, University of Dayton (Ohio), 1971. Master of Science, Electrical Engineering, Purdue University, 1972. PhD, Electrical Engineering, Purdue University, 1975.

== Control-Alt-Delete ==
According to Bradley, Control-Alt-Delete was not intended to be used by end users, originally—it was meant to be used by people writing programs or documentation, so that they could reboot their computers without powering them down. This was useful since after a computer was powered down, it was necessary to wait a few seconds before powering it up again to avoid potential damage to the power supply and hard drive. Since software developers and technical writers would need to restart a computer many times, this key combination was a big time-saver. David Bradley and Mel Hallerman chose this key combination because it is practically impossible to accidentally press this combination of keys on a standard original IBM PC keyboard.

However, the key combination was described in IBM's technical reference documentation and thereby revealed to the general public.

At the 20th anniversary of the IBM PC on August 8, 2001 at The Tech Museum, while on a panel with Bill Gates, Bradley said, "I have to share the credit. I may have invented it [Control-Alt-Delete], but I think Bill made it famous."

Multiple-key reboot had been introduced by Exidy, Inc., in 1978, for its Sorcerer Z80 computer. It provided two Reset buttons, which must be pressed simultaneously to achieve reboot.

In March 1980, the multiple-key reboot concept had been introduced for the Apple II by Videx in its VideoTerm display card add-on, requiring Control-Reset, rather than Reset alone, to reboot the machine. The innovation was noted and well received at the time.

== Other accomplishments ==
Bradley is the author of Assembly Language Programming for the IBM Personal Computer (Simon & Schuster, ISBN 0-13-049171-3, January 1984), also released in French as Assembleur sur IBM PC (Dunod, ISBN 2-225-80695-0), Russian ("Radio" Publishing House, Moscow), and Bulgarian ("Technica" Publishing house, 1989).

Bradley holds seven U.S. patents.

Bradley has been adjunct professor of electrical and computer engineering at Florida Atlantic University and at North Carolina State University.

Much of Bradley's career has been at IBM. Bradley received a B.E.E. degree in 1971 from the University of Dayton, (Ohio). He went on to Purdue University in West Lafayette, Indiana, where he completed an M.S. degree in 1972 and Ph.D. in 1975, both in electrical engineering. Upon graduation he went to work for IBM in Boca Raton, Florida, as senior associate engineer. He worked on the Series/1 system. In 1978 he developed the I/O system for the System/23 Datamaster.

In 1980, Bradley was one of twelve engineers developing the first IBM Personal Computer. Bradley developed the ROM BIOS. That got him promoted to manage the BIOS and diagnostics for the IBM PC/XT. In 1983 Bradley formed the Personal Systems Architecture Department. In 1984, he helped manage development of the Personal System/2 Model 30.

In November 1987, Bradley became manager of advanced processor design. His group developed the 486/25 Power Platform and the PS/2 Models 90 and 95. In 1991, he became manager of systems architecture for the Entry Systems Technology group. In 1992 he became the architecture manager for the group that developed a personal computer using the PowerPC RISC microprocessor.

In 1993, he returned to be the manager of architecture in the PC group.

On January 30, 2004, Bradley retired from IBM.

Bradley wrote about the development of the IBM PC, including Control-Alt-Delete, in the August 2011 issue of the IEEE's Computer magazine.
