= IBM PS/2 portable computers =

Portable Computer

The IBM PS/2 portables are Micro Channel architecture-based, portable PS/2 computers released by IBM in 1989.

== PS/2 P70 ==
IBM P70
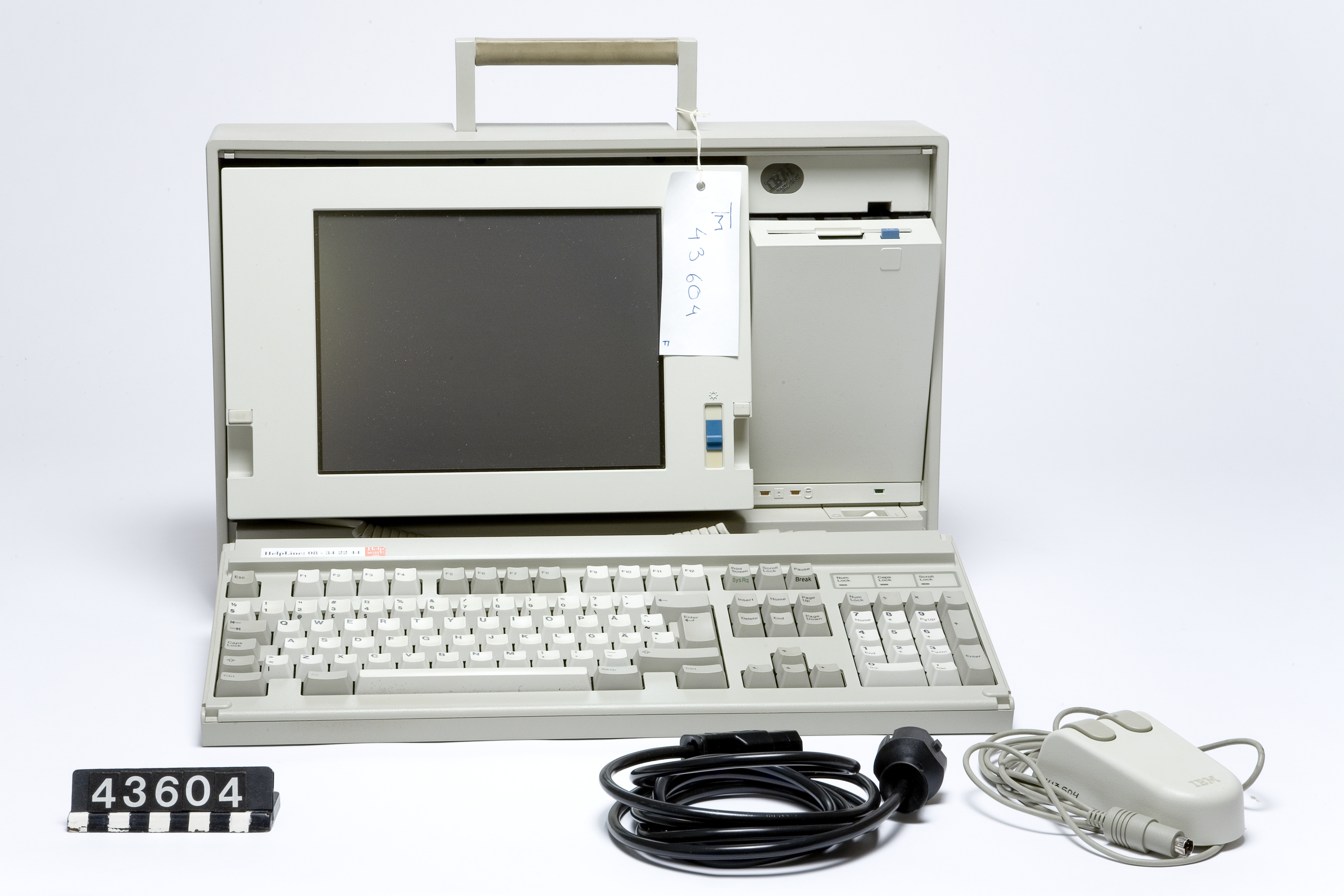
- Manufacturer: IBM
- Product family: PS/2
- Type: Portable Computer
- Released: May 1989
- Introductory price: US$7,695 (equivalent to $20,000 in 2025)
- CPU: Intel 386 @ 16 or 20 MHz
- Memory: Four 72-pin SIMMs (up to 8 MB)
- Storage: 30, 60, or 120 MB ESDI hard disk
- Display: 10" gas plasma
- Graphics: VGA (640x480)
- Dimensions: 12"H x 18.3"W x 5"D
- Weight: 20.8 lb (9.4 kg)

In May 1989, IBM released the PS/2 Model P70, a portable version of the PS/2 Model 70 386 that weighed 21 pounds (9.5 kg) (the same as the Model 70 386 desktop) and had a carrying handle. It featured a 20-MHz Intel 386 processor, 4 MB of RAM stock, and a flat-panel, amber-tined, monochrome gas plasma display. It was IBM's third attempt at a portable PC in the United States, after the market failures that were the Portable PC and the PC Convertible.

The P70 model was released in Japan as PS/55 5545-T with the same specs, but with different keyboard layout.

== PS/2 P75 ==
IBM P75
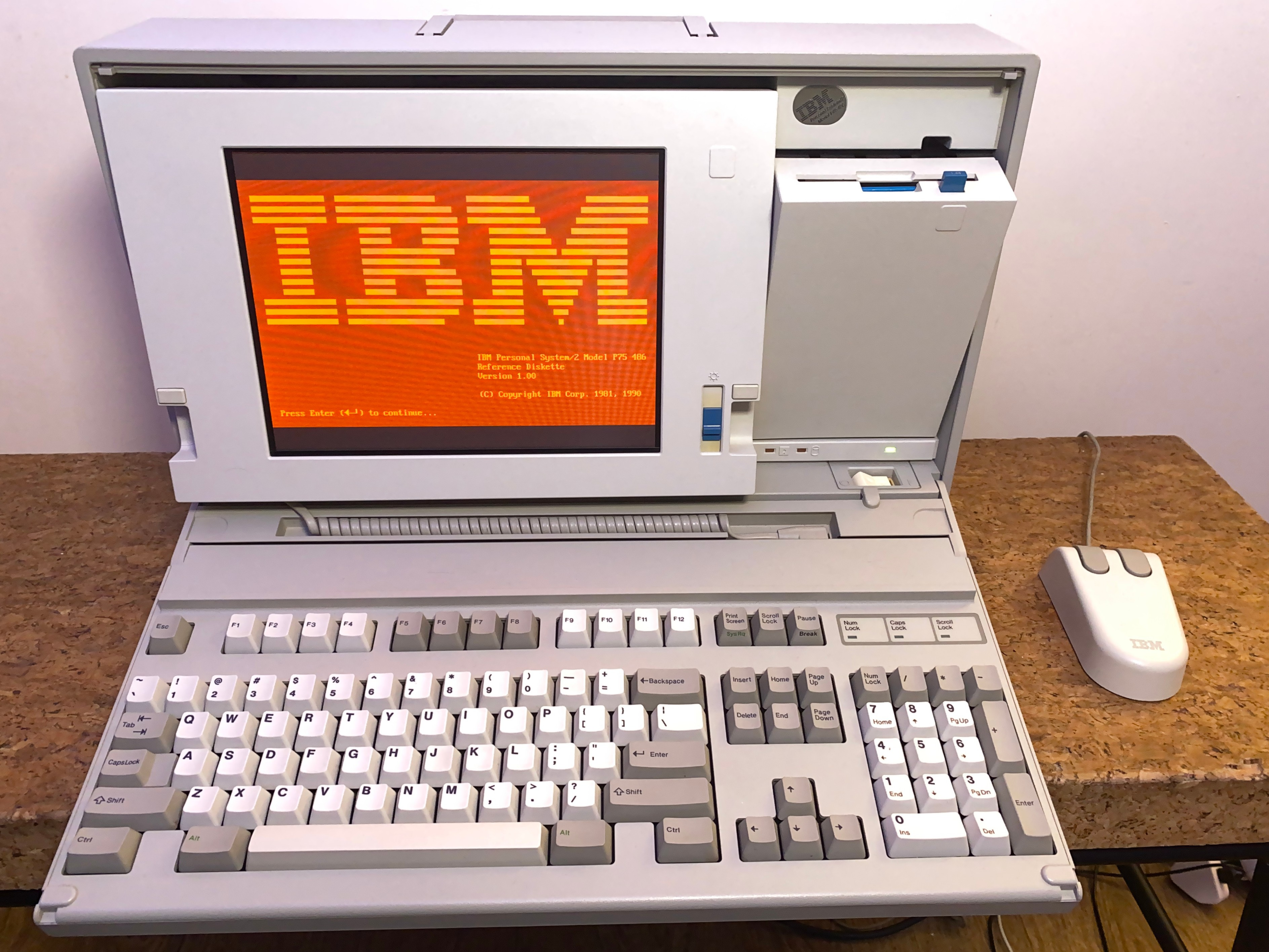
- Manufacturer: IBM
- Product family: PS/2
- Type: Portable Computer
- Released: November 1990
- Introductory price: US$15,990 (equivalent to $39,400 in 2025)
- CPU: Intel i486 DX-33 @ 33 MHz
- Storage: 160 MB or 400 MB SCSI internal hard disk
- Display: 10" gas plasma
- Graphics: XGA-1 (640x480)
- Predecessor: IBM P70

The P75 was a released in 1990 upgraded version of P70 model, and is noted as being the first portable computer using a 486 CPU to be available for sale in the United States. It had a briefcase-shaped design and ran off A/C power only, as was common with high performance portable computers at the time. It featured an Intel 80486 DX-33 CPU, and an internal 10-inch flat gas plasma display at 640x480 resolution with 16 shades of grey. The computer had relatively high performance specifications at the time it was released and could be used as a portable server. The cost reflected this performance; the IBM P75 retailed at US$15,990 for the base configuration, to over $18,500 or more depending on options.

Two versions of the P75 were sold, with the only difference between the two being hard drive capacity:

- 8573-161 - came with a 160 MB SCSI hard disk drive
- 8573-401 - came with a 400 MB SCSI hard disk drive

=== Design ===
The IBM P75 in its travelling configuration resembles a briefcase with a carrying handle - all components such as the screen, floppy disk drive and keyboard are stowed away behind the keyboard during transport. To use the computer, one places the computer on a desk and opens the latches at either side of the front of the computer to release the keyboard, which swings down. The keyboard can then be fully released from the main unit and height adjusted for comfort. The screen viewing angle can also be adjusted by pulling on tabs on either side of the screen. To access the floppy drive, one pushes on a raised square on the floppy drive disk cover to release it.

=== Hardware ===
The IBM P75 has similar specifications to an IBM model 90, but has been made into a portable. It features an Intel i486-DX 33 CPU that is housed on a processor complex card separate from the motherboard. The computer uses IBM's Micro Channel architecture (MCA) bus and has 4 internal bus slots: one 32-bit AVE, one 32-bit MME, and two 16-bit short slots.

The internal gas plasma display of the IBM P75 is XGA/VGA, EGA, MCGA, CGA compatible, and operates at a maximum 640×480 in 16 shades of grey in VGA mode. The IBM P75 can drive its internal monitor and an external monitor simultaneously. When driving the external monitor only, it can operate at 800x600 resolution in 16-bit (high-colour) in Windows 95 using third party drivers.

The keyboard is a 101 key, full size and full travel IBM keyboard and serves as both the keyboard of the unit and the cover of the unit when being transported. It is attached to the computer through a 14-inch rolled-coil cable.

Hard disk configurations were available in 2 varieties, a 160 MB SCSI hard disk drive (model 8573-161) or a 400 MB SCSI (model 8573-401), with the onboard SCSI controller being capable of handling drives up to 1GB.

The IBM P75 supports up to 16 megabytes of Random-access memory through 4 SIMM slots on the motherboard, each of which can accept a 2 MB or 4 MB 70 nanosecond SIMM. The SIMM must be manufactured by IBM for the computer to accept them – non-IBM SIMMs or generic SIMMs that do not utilise the "presence detect" feature cannot be used unless modified. The stock configuration of RAM on IBM P75 is 8 MB.

The IBM P75 featured numerous ports, including an external SCSI connector, a parallel port, a serial port, a PS/2 mouse port, an external 5.25" floppy disk port, and a VGA port. The ports are housed behind a door on the rear of the unit which allows for them to be hidden when not in use. The recess behind the door can also be used to store a power cable during transit. Power is supplied to the IBM P75 through an IEC C14 socket, the PSU accepts 100-240v 3.0A

=== Software ===
The IBM P75, like other contemporary PS/2 computers of the period, utilises reference diskettes to make any changes to system settings such as the installed memory size, the assignment of the built-in connectors, and installed options with their location and assignments. System settings are stored in CMOS and data integrity is maintained through an internal non-rechargeable 6V battery. Should the internal 6V battery run low, the computer may not POST successfully as the internal CMOS contents are corrupted. The reference diskette also includes basic diagnostic software. If the computer is booted without an operating system and/or hard disk, the P75 will boot into IBM Cassette BASIC.

IBM did not ship with any additional operating system, but is fully compatible with OS/2, AIX, MS-DOS, IBM PC DOS and Microsoft Windows.
