= IBM PS/2 Model 60 =

1987 IBM desktop computer

Personal System/2 Model 60

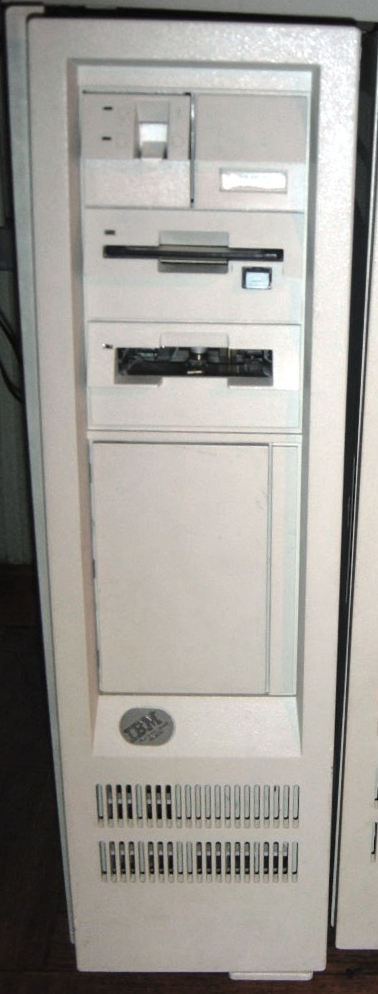
- A PS/2 Model 60 with tape drive
- Developer: International Business Machines Corporation (IBM)
- Manufacturer: IBM
- Product family: Personal System/2
- Type: Desktop computer
- Released: April 2, 1987; 39 years ago
- Lifespan: 1987–1990
- Discontinued: October 1990
- Media: 1.44 MB 3.5-in floppy disks
- CPU: Intel 80286 at 10 MHz
- Memory: 1 MB – 7 MB
- Storage: 44–70 MB hard drive
- Graphics: Video Graphics Array
- Power: 120/240 VAC ～
- Predecessor: Personal Computer AT
- Successor: IBM PS/2 Model 65 SX
- Related: List of IBM PS/2 models

The Personal System/2 Model 60 is a high-end desktop computer in IBM's Personal System/2 (PS/2) family of personal computers. First released in April 1987, the Model 60 uses an Intel 80286 processor running at a clock speed of 10 MHz, the same as its midrange counterpart, the Personal System/2 Model 50. Unlike the Model 50, the Model 60 is built into a tower case and has four more 16-bit MCA expansion slots and an additional drive bay. The Model 60 was IBM's first Intel-based PC with a tower form factor and was influential in popularizing towers in computer case design.

IBM followed up the Model 60 with the 32-bit Personal System/2 Model 80 which has an i386 processor and eight 32-bit MCA slots, in late 1987, and directly replaced the Model 60 with the Personal System/2 Model 65 SX, which has an i386SX and eight 16-bit MCA slots (same as the Model 60), in early 1990. Both the Model 80 and Model 65 have identical tower cases to the Model 60. IBM discontinued the Model 60 in October 1990.

== Specifications and release ==
=== Model 60 ===
The PS/2 Model 60 was introduced on April 2, 1987, alongside the lower-end Model 30 and the midrange Model 50. Both the PS/2 Model 60 and the Model 50 featured identical Intel 80286 processors clocked at 10 MHz and served as the public market introduction of Video Graphics Array (VGA) and Micro Channel architecture (MCA). MCA was a proprietary bus standard designed by IBM to replace the aging Industry Standard Architecture (ISA) first used in their earlier IBM PCs, while VGA was an upgraded graphics standard for IBM's PCs and compatibles, supporting higher resolutions and greater color bit depth. Unlike the Model 50, the Model 60 built into a tower computer case and featured four additional 16-bit MCA expansion slots as well as an additional drive bay. Because of the Model 60's increased potential for connectivity and multitasking, technology journalists envisioned the PS/2 Model 60 as a multiuser machine.

The Model 60 was originally available in two configurations: one with a 44-MB, ST-506 hard disk drive, for US$5,295; and another with a 70-MB hard drive and a faster ESDI disk interface, for $6,295. This compared to $3,595 for the midrange Model 50. Owing to its relatively slow DRAM, rated for 125-ns access times, the original Model 60 inserts wait states for every memory access operation, leading to compromised performance compared to 286-class machines with an equivalent clock speed but faster RAM. This same issue also plagued the original Personal System/2 Model 50, which IBM corrected with the Model 50 Z in 1988. The Model 60 continued to have the same slow RAM chips throughout its existence, however.

=== Model 65 SX ===
On March 20, 1990, IBM introduced the PS/2 Model 65 SX, featuring the cost-reduced i386SX processor by Intel clocked at 16 MHz. Internally, the i386SX supports 32-bit operations, but its data bus could only access RAM 16 bits at a time. Because of this, the Model 65 SX contains only 16-bit MCA slots, exactly like the Model 60. The Model 65 SX upgraded the on-board disk controller to SCSI from ESDI and had faster on-board memory chips and support for 1 MB more of RAM, however. The Model 65 SX directly replaced the Model 60, the final units of which rolled off the line at IBM's factory in Boca Raton in October 1990.

== Sales and reception ==
The Model 60 was initially manufactured at IBM's facility in Boca Raton, Florida. Compared to other models in the PS/2 line, the Model 60 was a slow seller; by July 1987, the Boca Raton factory was producing only 800 Model 60s daily, compared to 1,000 Model 50s. The Model 60 continued to sell poorly throughout its three year lifespan; by January 1990, it was the worst selling PS/2 in the entire line-up, IBM shipping fewer units per month than even the more-expensive PS/2 Model 80. In early 1989, IBM moved manufacturing of the Model 60 from Boca Raton to Raleigh, North Carolina, after shutting down their production lines reserved for computer systems in Boca Raton.

In a longform review in PC Magazine, journalist Winn L. Rosch concluded that the Model 60 was priced out for customers wanting to use the machine in a single-user configuration for simple applications, the added expansion slots over the Model 50 "[not] very useful considering all the features packed onto the Model 60 system board". For multiuser and high-load file server applications, however, Rosch concluded that the Model 60 "will serve well". Of the computer's graphical performance, InfoWorld's Steve Satchell wrote that the "Model 60's video performance is nothing less than astounding", representing the first time the magazine had reviewed a PC where components of a windowing system were drawn instantly on screen instead of being painted slowly. On the whole, despite several reservations about high price and serviceability, Satchell concluded: "The bottom line is that the Model 60's great performance balances these uncertainties, resulting in a satisfactory value".

== Legacy ==
Although a poor seller, the PS/2 Model 60 (as well as the Model 80) started the trend of computer manufacturers offering PC compatibles in optional tower form factors. By May 1988, over a dozen companies were selling desktops in a tower form factor at that year's Comdex, according to The New York Times. By the mid-1990s, tower computers had overtaken traditional horizontal desktop cases in terms of sales.

== Related models ==
=== Model 80 ===
In July 1987, IBM shipped the PS/2 Model 80, their first personal computer with the 32-bit i386 processor, in an identical tower case to the Model 60. Unlike the Model 60, the Model 80 features several 32-bit MCA slots, allowing the computer to take full advantage of the most advanced Micro Channel cards on the market. IBM sold the Model 80 alongside the Model 60 for several years.

=== Academic System ===
The 6152 Academic System was a workstation computer developed by IBM's Academic Information Systems (ACIS) division for the university market introduced in February 1988. The 6152 was based on the PS/2 Model 60, adding a RISC Adapter Card on the Micro Channel bus. This card was a co-processor that enabled the 6152 to run ROMP software compiled for IBM's Academic Operating System (AOS), a version of BSD UNIX for the ROMP that was only available to select colleges and universities.

The RISC Adapter Card contained the ROMP-C microprocessor (an enhanced version of the ROMP that first appeared in the IBM RT PC workstations), a memory management unit (the ROMP had virtual memory), a floating-point coprocessor, and up to 8 MB of memory for use by the ROMP. The 6152 was the first computer to use the ROMP-C, which would later be introduced in new RT PC models.

== Submodels ==
IBM PS/2 Model 60 submodels
Model	IBM P/N	Processor	Clock speed (MHz)	Bus	No. of slots	No. of drive bays	FDD	HDD	Stock RAM	Maximum RAM	Video adapter	Monitor	Form factor	Date introduced	Notes	Ref(s).
60	8560-041	Intel 80286	10 (1 w)	MCA, 16-bit	8	4	one 1.44 MB	44 MB (ST-506)	1 MB	7 MB	VGA	optional	Tower	April 1987		
60	8560-071	Intel 80286	10 (1 w)	MCA, 16-bit	8	4	one 1.44 MB	70 MB (ESDI)	1 MB	7 MB	VGA	optional	Tower	April 1987		
65 SX	8565-061	Intel 386SX	16	MCA, 16-bit	8	4	one 1.44 MB	60 MB (SCSI)	2 MB	8 MB	VGA	optional	Tower	March 1990		
65 SX	8565-121	Intel 386SX	16	MCA, 16-bit	8	4	one 1.44 MB	120 MB (SCSI)	2 MB	8 MB	VGA	optional	Tower	March 1990		
65 SX	8565-321	Intel 386SX	16	MCA, 16-bit	8	4	one 1.44 MB	320 MB (SCSI)	2 MB	8 MB	VGA	optional	Tower	October 1990		
