= IBM PS/2 Model 50 =

1987 IBM desktop computer

Personal System/2 Model 50

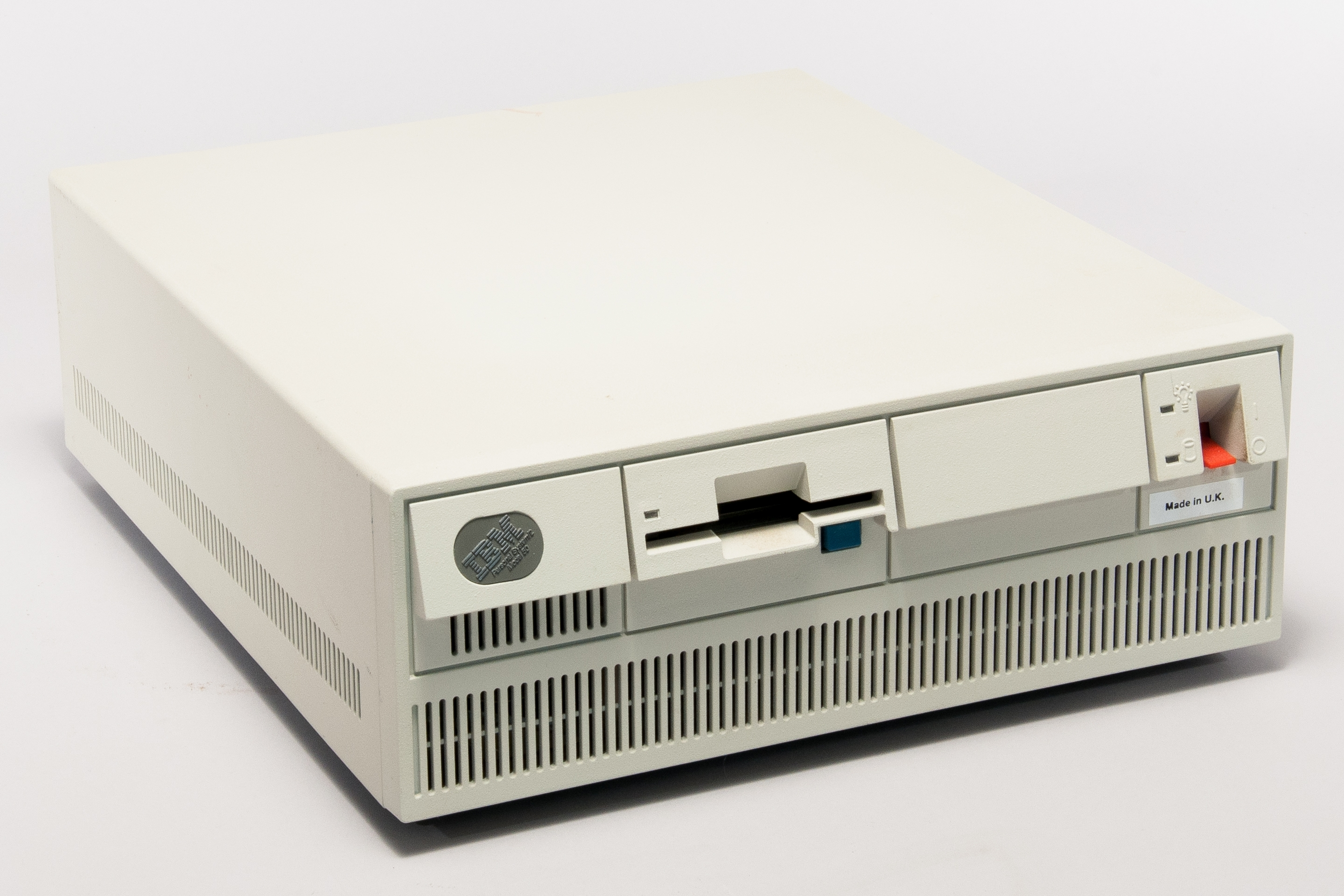
- An original PS/2 Model 50
- Developer: International Business Machines Corporation (IBM)
- Manufacturer: IBM
- Product family: Personal System/2
- Type: Desktop computer
- Released: April 2, 1987; 39 years ago (Model 50); June 2, 1988 (Model 50 Z)
- Units sold: About 1 million
- Media: 1.44 MB 3.5-in floppy disks
- CPU: Intel 80286 at 10 MHz
- Memory: 1 MB – 7 MB, 1 MB – 16 MB (Model 50 Z)
- Storage: 20–60 MB hard drive
- Graphics: Video Graphics Array
- Power: 120/240 VAC ～
- Predecessor: Personal Computer AT
- Related: List of IBM PS/2 models

The Personal System/2 Model 50 is a midrange desktop computer in IBM's Personal System/2 (PS/2) family of personal computers. First released in April 1987, the Model 50 features an Intel 80286 processor running at a clock speed of 10 MHz. In June 1988, the PS/2 Model 50 received an update in the form of the Personal System/2 Model 50 Z, which offered faster RAM, eliminating the insertion of wait states endemic to the original Model 50 and increasing system performance. The Model 50 was the best-selling line of PS/2 for several years, IBM selling over 440,000 units in the first year of its availability.

== Development and release ==
The PS/2 Model 50 was introduced on April 2, 1987, alongside the lower-end Model 30 and the higher-end Model 60. The PS/2 Model 50, as well as the Model 60, served as the public market introduction of the Micro Channel architecture (MCA), a proprietary bus standard designed by IBM to replace the aging Industry Standard Architecture (ISA) first used in their earlier IBM PCs. Being a midrange offering, the Model 50 retailed for US$3,595—compared to $2,295 for the entry-level Model 30, which featured an ISA bus. The Model 50 was built into a standard desktop-form-factor case, whereas the Model 60 was built into a tower case and featured more drive bays and expansion slots.

The Model 50 was manufactured at IBM's facility in Boca Raton, Florida. By June 1987, the factory was producing 1,000 Model 50s daily, compared to 800 Model 60s. The Model 50 proved so popular that the factory experienced parts shortages by the end of the year. Within the first year of its availability, IBM sold over 440,000 units of the Model 50, according to Dataquest, with an additional 650,000 units projected for 1988. By April 1988, it was the top-selling personal computer globally; it occupied the top spot in this segment into at least late 1989, while in the United Kingdom it was still the best-selling PC in mid-1990.

== Specifications ==
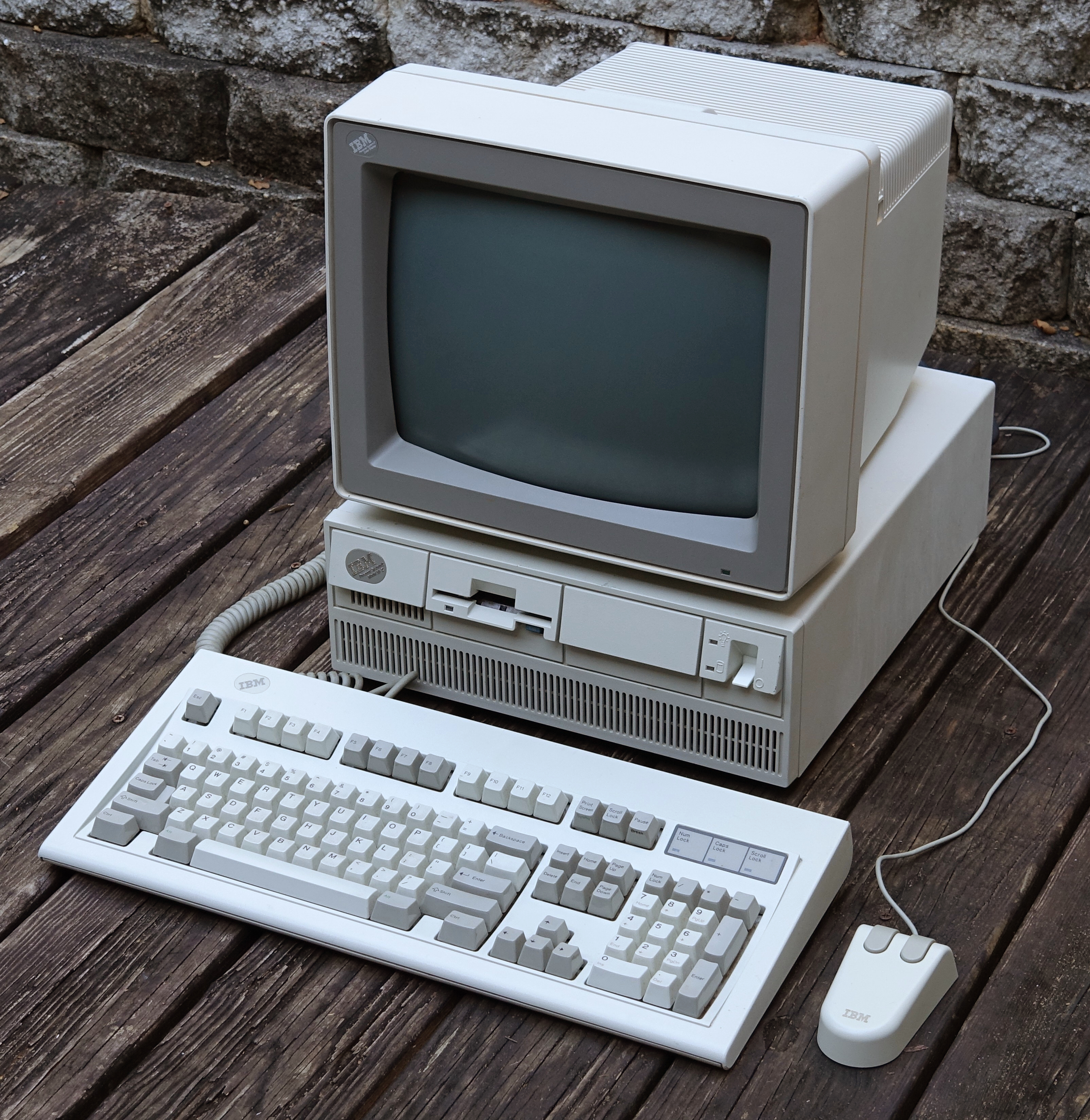
IBM PS/2 Model 50 Z CPU (Type 8550) with 5812-001 monitor, Model M keyboard and PS/2 mouse.

The Model 50 was the most inexpensive entry in the PS/2 line to feature Micro Channel architecture (MCA) expansion slots, featuring four MCA slots (compared to the Model 60's eight). As with any MCA-equipped PS/2 computer, it lacked the ability to take ISA expansion cards of any kind. The Model 50 was also the most inexpensive entry in the PS/2 line feature a Video Graphics Array (VGA) display interface, which offered more color bit depth and resolution modes than the earlier Enhanced Graphics Adapter (EGA) of the IBM PC line. The Model 50 occupies a chassis roughly half the volume of its direct predecessor, the PC/AT. Like the PC/AT, the Model 50 features an Intel 80286 processor, running at a clock speed of 10 MHz. As with all models in the PS/2 range, the Model 50 features a single 3.5-inch floppy disk drive, replacing the 5.25-inch floppy disk drive of the IBM PC.

Novel to the Model 50's industrial design among its contemporaries in the PC arena is its largely tool-less method of disassembly. Two thumbscrews at the back of the unit allow the user to pull the lid off the Model 50. Inside, the hard disk and floppy disk drives are affixed to a platform resting above the motherboard, able to be removed through the prying of plastic, captive push-pin tabs; IBM shipped the machine with a small plastic wedge (so-called the "crowbar") to assist in the removal of these tabs. Expansion cards are likewise able to be removed from the motherboard with plastic thumbscrews.

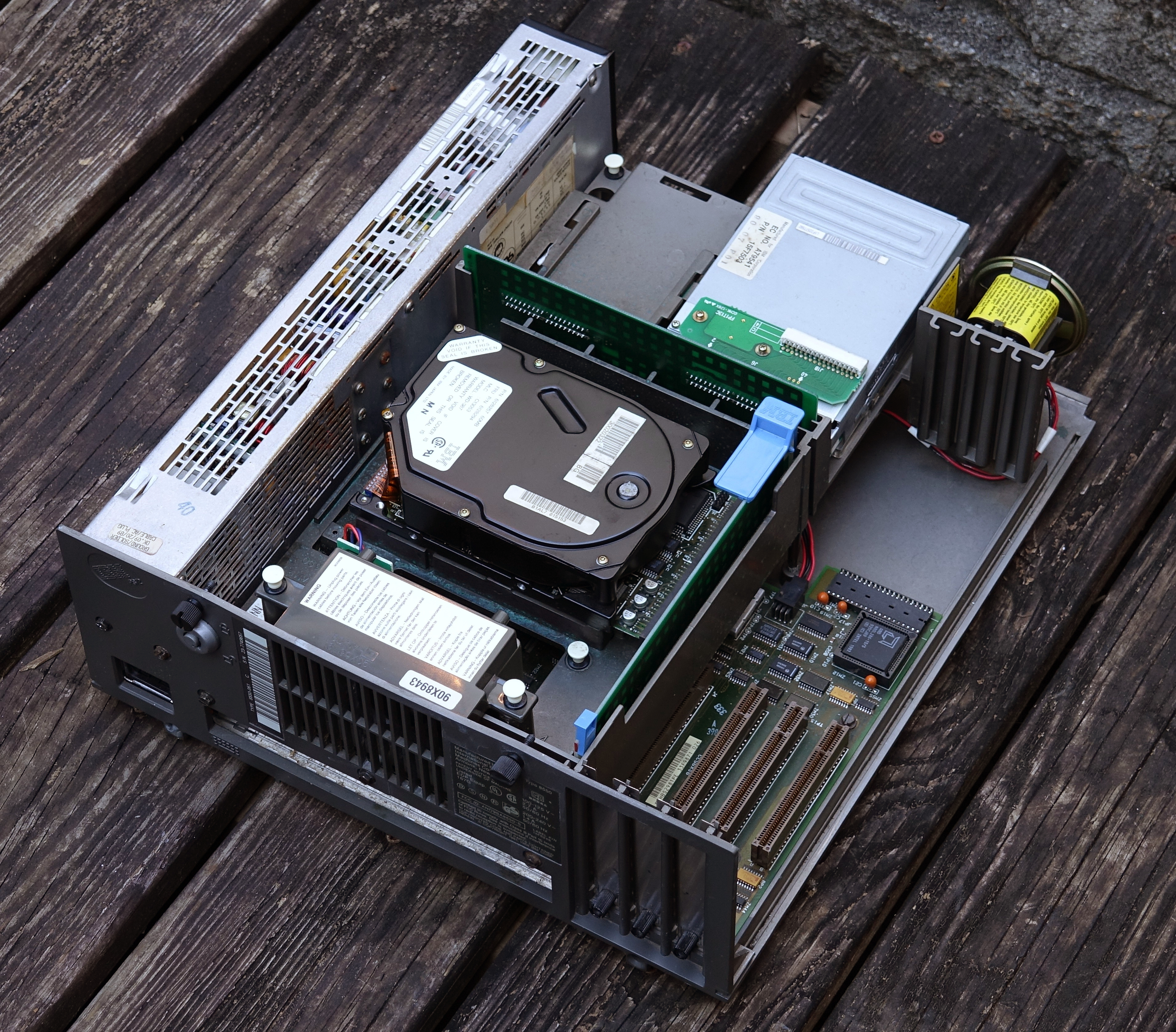
Internals of an IBM PS2 Model 50 Z

Owing to its relatively slow DRAM, rated for 125-ns access times, the original Model 50 inserts wait states for every memory access operation, leading to sluggish performance. On June 2, 1988, IBM introduced the Model 50 Z, which replaced the on-board 125-ns DRAM of its predecessor with 85-ns DRAM, leading to a memory and number-crunching performance boost of roughly 20 percent, according to PC Magazine. In addition, the Model 50's dual 30-pin SIMM slots was replaced by a single 72-pin SIMM slot on the Model 50 Z, able to take a 1-MB or 2-MB SIMM (compared to only 512-KB SIMMs on the Model 50). The Model 50 Z, as well as the Model 70 (introduced on the same day), served as the market introduction of the 72-pin SIMM form factor. These replaced the 30-pin SIMMs of older models and had the advantage of having a 32-bit data path, allowing modules to be installed individually in a 16-bit or a 32-bit system (the Model 50 Z is 16-bit while the Model 70 is 32-bit) whereas 30-pin SIMMs required installing in groups of four in a 32-bit system owing to their 8-bit data path The Model 50 Z also replaced the stock 20-MB hard disk drive of the Model 50 with optional 30-MB or 60-MB hard drives, with seek times rated twice as fast as the Model 50's 20-MB disk.

== Reception and legacy ==
The Model 50 received mixed reviews from users and the press at the time of its release, with critics citing its relative affordability and hardware innovations as points for it; and hardware bugs, slow number-crunching performance, and also slow stock hard drive as points against it. However, PC Magazine retrospectively called it one of the most influential personal computers from the 1980s to the 2020s, owing to its role in bringing VGA and 3.5-inch floppy drives to the masses, as well as influencing the design of future personal computers with its tool-less construction. In addition, the 72-pin SIMM form factor that the Model 50 Z introduced quickly became a de facto industry standard for RAM modules and was in widespread use in PCs until the development of DIMMs in the mid-1990s.

== Submodels ==
IBM PS/2 Model 50 submodels
Model	IBM P/N	Processor	Clock speed (MHz)	Bus	No. of slots	No. of drive bays	FDD	HDD	Stock RAM	Maximum RAM	Video adapter	Monitor	Form factor	Date introduced	Notes	Ref(s).
50	8550-021	Intel 80286	10 (1 w)	MCA, 16-bit	4	3	one 1.44 MB	20 MB (ST-506)	1 MB	7 MB	VGA	optional	Desktop	April 1987		
50 Z	8550-031	Intel 80286	10 (0 w)	MCA, 16-bit	4	3	one 1.44 MB	30 MB (ST-506)	1 MB	16 MB	VGA	optional	Desktop	June 1988		
50 Z	8550-061	Intel 80286	10 (0 w)	MCA, 16-bit	4	3	one 1.44 MB	60 MB (ESDI)	1 MB	16 MB	VGA	optional	Desktop	June 1988		
