= INS Amini =

INS Amini (P75) may refer to the following vessels of the Indian Navy:

- INS Amini (1974), an Arnala-class corvette commissioned in 1972 and decommissioned in 2002
- INS Amini (2023), launched in 2023
