= Intel DX4 =

4th generation x86 CPU

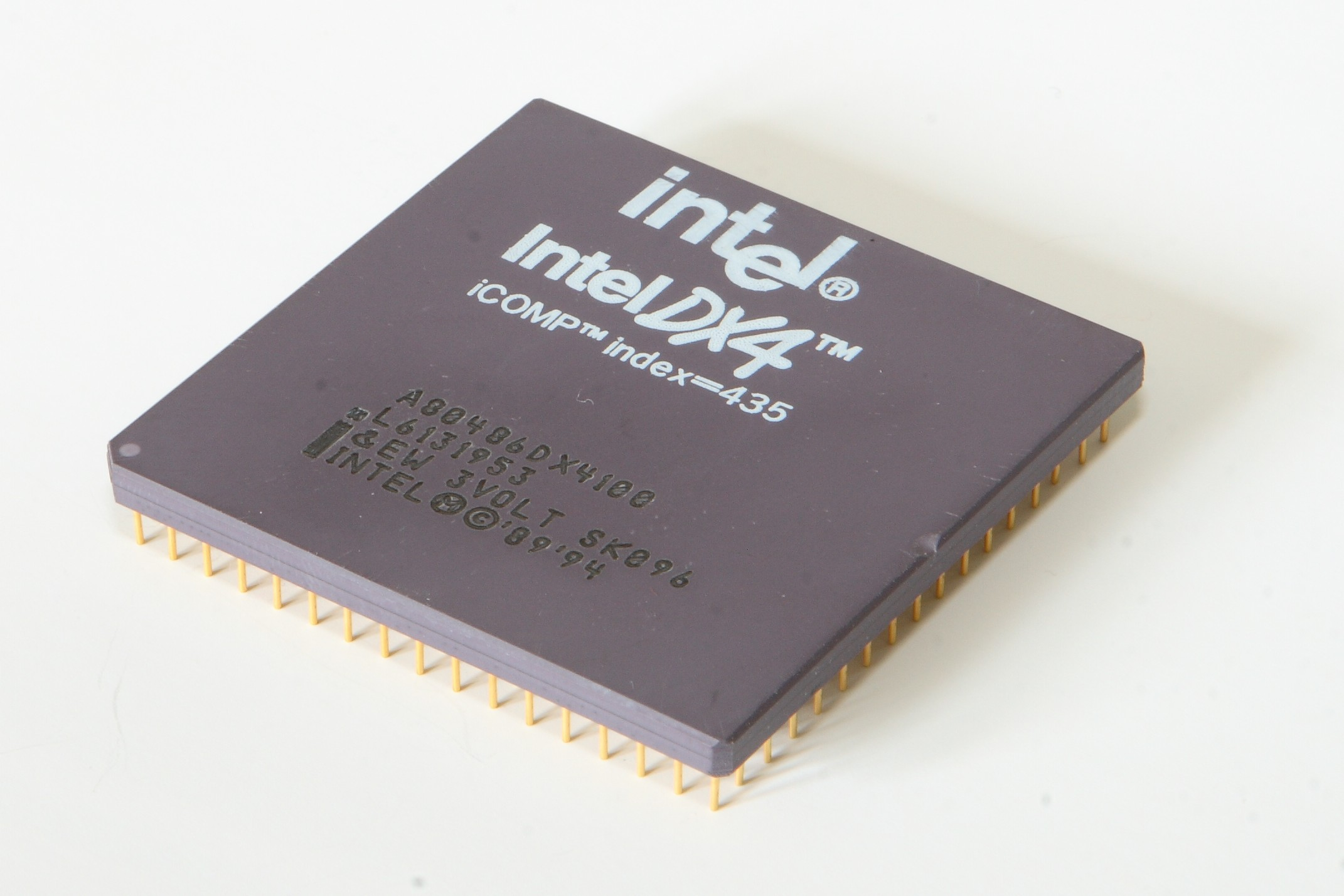
Intel DX4 100 MHz

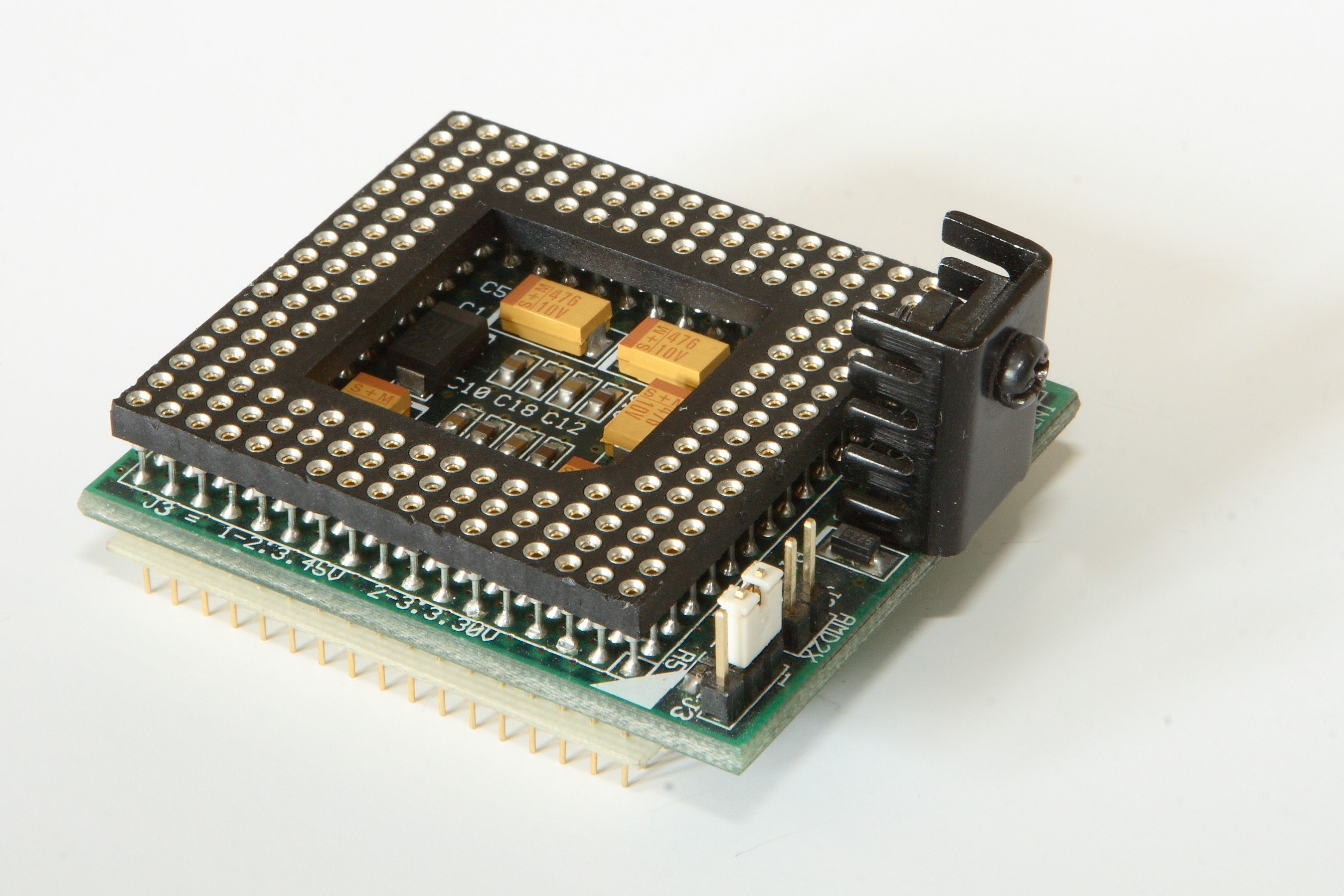
Voltage converter for DX4 processors (5 V to 3.3 V)

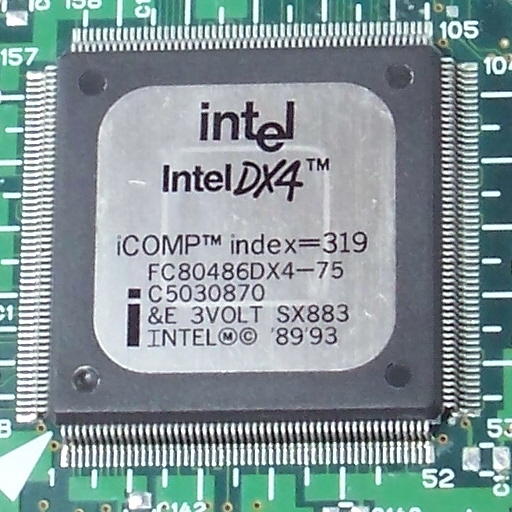
An IntelDX4 FC80486DX4-75 SX883 75 MHz (3× 25 MHz) 16 KB cache L1 WT. This unit was made in January 1995, and was taken from a Toshiba laptop.

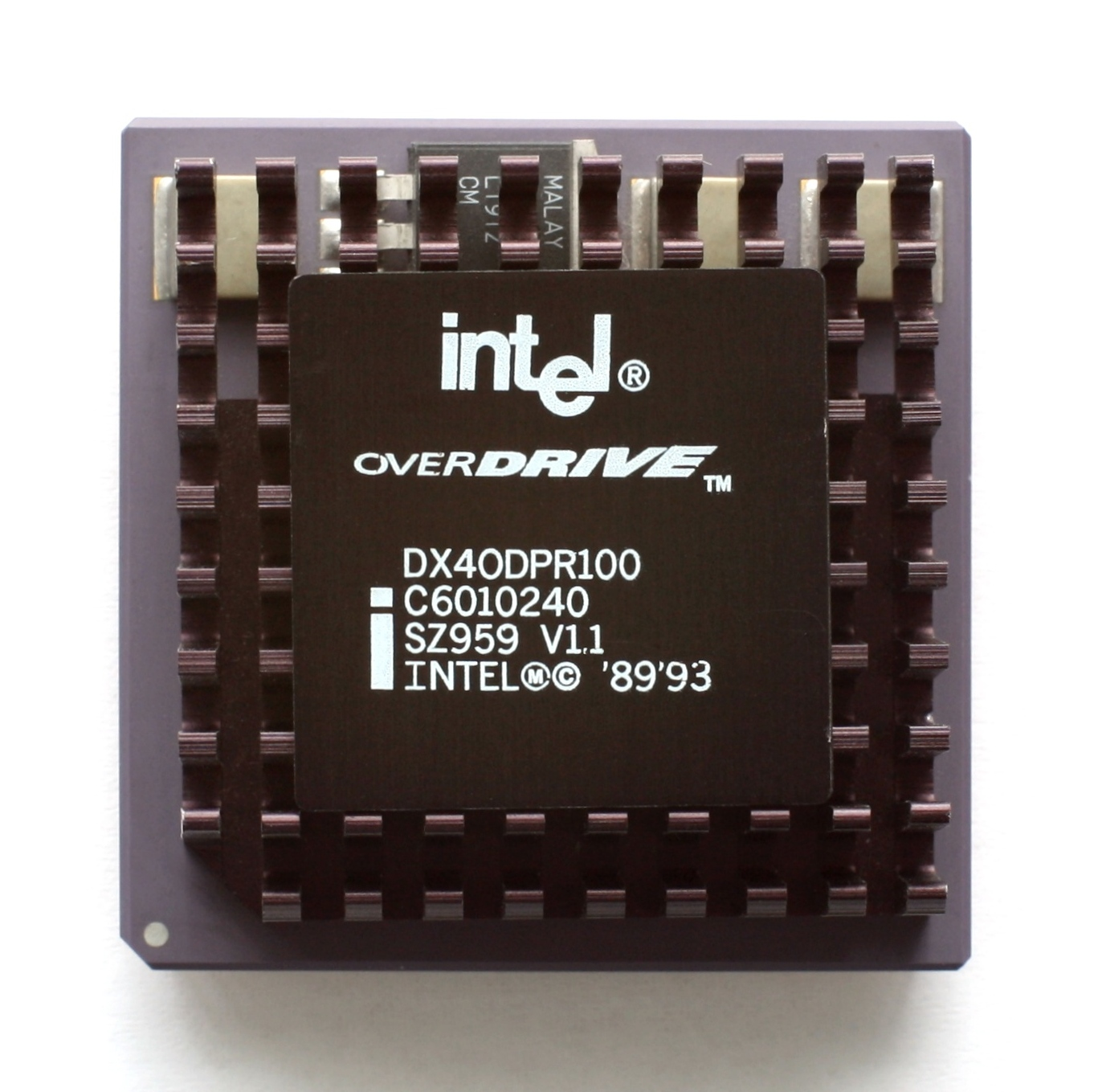
Intel DX4 Overdrive

IntelDX4 is a clock-tripled i486 microprocessor with 16 KB level 1 cache. Intel named it DX4 (rather than DX3) as a consequence of litigation with Advanced Micro Devices over trademarks. The product was officially named IntelDX4, but OEMs continued using the i486 naming convention.

Intel produced IntelDX4s with two clock speed steppings: A 75-MHz version (3× 25 MHz multiplier), and a 100-MHz version (3× 33.3 MHz or 2x 50 MHz). Both chips were released in March 1994. The write-back cache versions of IntelDX4 began sampling in September 1995, with a full production switch-over expected in early 1996. The original write-through versions of the chip are marked with a laser-embossed “&E,” while the write-back-enabled versions are marked “&EW.” i486 OverDrive editions of IntelDX4 had locked multipliers, and therefore can only run at 3× the external clock speed. The 100-MHz model of the processor had an iCOMP rating of 435, while the 75-MHz processor had a rating of 319. IntelDX4 was an OEM-only product, but the DX4 Overdrive could be purchased at a retail store.

The IntelDX4 microprocessor is mostly pin-compatible with the i486, but requires a lower 3.3-V supply. Normal i486DX and DX2 processors use a 5-V supply; plugging a DX4 into an unmodified socket will destroy the processor. Motherboards lacking support for the 3.3-V CPUs can sometimes make use of them using a voltage regulator module (VRM) that fits between the socket and the CPU. The i486 DX4 OverDrive CPUs have voltage regulator modules built in.

== Specifications ==
Processor speed (MHz)	Input clock (MHz) and multiplier	Voltage (nominal) (V)	Voltage range (V)	Part number	Sspec number
75	25 × 3	3.3	3.1–3.6	FC80486DX4-75	SK052, SX883
75	25 × 3	3.3	3.1–3.6	A80486DX4-75	SK047, SX884
75	25 × 3	3.3	3.1–3.5	A80486DX4WB-75	SK102
75	25 × 3	3.3	3.1–3.5	FC80486DX4WB-75	SK100
100	33 × 3	3.3, 3.45	3.1–3.6	FC80486DX4-100	SX906
100	33 × 3	3.45	3.3–3.6	A80486DX4-100	SK051, SX900
100	33 × 3	3.45	3.3–3.6	A80486DX4WB-100	SK096
100	33 × 3, 50 × 2	3.45	3.3–3.6	FC80486DX4-100	SX876
100	33 × 3, 50 × 2	3.3, 3.45	3.1–3.6	FC80486DX4-100	SK053
100	33 × 3, 50 × 2	3.45	3.3–3.6	A80486DX4-100	SX877
100	33 × 3, 50 × 2	3.3	3.1–3.6	A80486DX4-100	SK050
100	33 × 3, 50 × 2	3.3	3.1–3.6	A80486DX4WB-100	Limited availability
100	33 × 3, 50 × 2	3.3	3.1–3.6	FC80486DX4WB-100	SK099
