= ST-506/ST-412 =

Hard disk drive

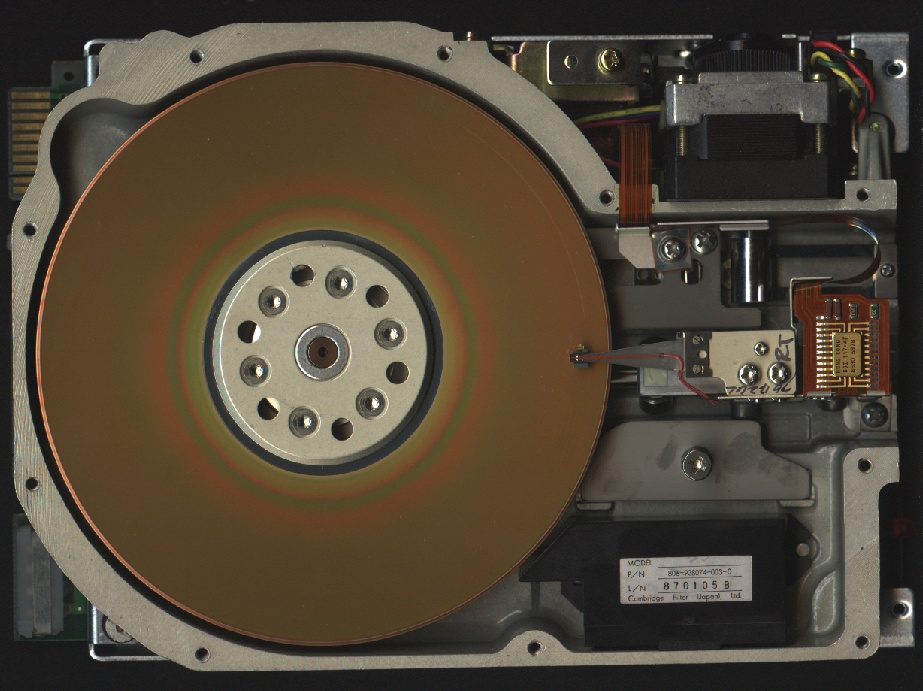
Seagate ST506 5¼-inch HDD with cover removed

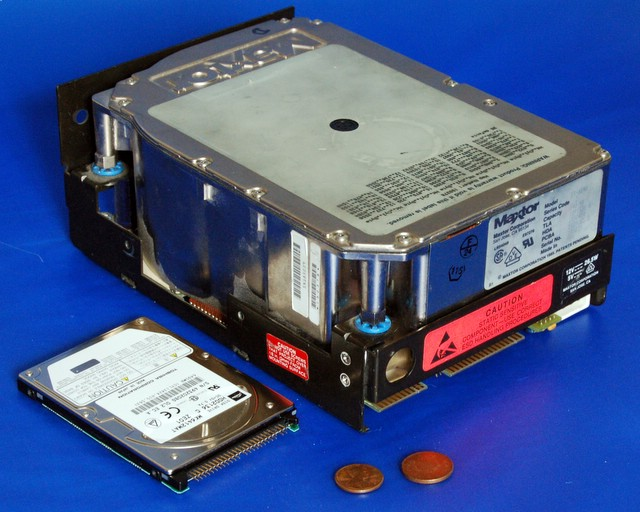
2.5" 6495 MB IDE drive next to a 5.25" full-height 111 MB MFM drive

The ST-506 and ST-412 (sometimes written ST506 and ST412) were early hard disk drives introduced by Seagate in 1980 and 1981 respectively, that later became construed as hard disk drive interfaces: the ST-506 disk interface and the ST-412 disk interface. Introduced in 1980, the ST-506 was the first 5.25 inch HDD. Its successor, the ST-412, was introduced in 1981 and implemented a refinement to the seek speed, and increased the drive capacity from 5 MB to 10 MB, but was otherwise highly similar.

Beginning with its selection as the hard drive subsystem for the original IBM XT, disk drive controllers supporting the ST-412 interface grew to become ubiquitous in the personal computer industry. The ST-412 interface and its variants were the de facto industry standard for personal computer hard disks until the advent and wider adoption of the IDE or ATA interface in the early 1990s.

== History ==
The ST-506 HDD was the first 5.25 inch hard disk drive, introduced in 1980 by Shugart Technology (now Seagate Technology). It stored up to 5 megabytes after formatting (153 cylinders, 4 heads, 32 sectors/track, 256 bytes/sector) and cost US$1,500 (equivalent to $5,861 in 2025). The similar, 10-megabyte ST-412 HDD was introduced in late 1981 (with 306 cylinders). The ST225 was introduced shortly thereafter with 20 megabytes and half the height. All three used MFM encoding, a widely used coding scheme. A subsequent extension of the ST-412 interface, the ST-412HP, used RLL encoding for a 50% increase in capacity and bit rate.

The ST-506 drive connected to a computer system through a disk controller. The ST-506 interface between the controller and drive was derived from the Shugart Associates SA1000 interface, which was in turn based upon the floppy disk drive interface, thereby making disk controller design relatively easy.

The ST-412 interface was adopted by numerous HDD manufacturers such that the interface became a de facto industry standard for disk drives well into the 1990s.

The limitations of the ST-412 interface are 5 million transitions per second maximum on data lines, 16 heads, 4 drive units and a 20-foot (6.1 m) cable length. The standard channel code for the ST-412 (and ST-506) is MFM with one data bit per transition for a data rate of 5 Mbit/s. The ST-412HP RLL variant averages 1.5 data bits per transition for a data rate of 7.5 Mbit/s.

== Interface to controller ==
A 34-pin control cable and a 20-pin data cable for an ST-412 drive connected to a controller card. A 4-pin Molex connector supplying power to the drive can not be seen in this image.

In the ST-506 interface, the drive connects to a controller card with two ribbon cables carrying signals, while a third cable provides power. The two signal cables are the wide 34-pin control cable and the narrow 20-pin data cable. The control cable interface is very similar to the standard Shugart floppy disk interface; like that floppy disk interface, it can support four drives. The data cable carries two (Read, Write) separate unidirectional RS-422 compatible differential signal pairs with 100ohm terminating resistors. As with floppy disk drives, a flux reversal corresponds to a rising edge (the positive line of the differential pair attaining a more positive voltage than the negative pair) of a short pulse that is ended with a falling edge after a fixed timeout and thus a return-to-zero code. Even though the timing of these pulses and flux reversals is completely in the hands of the controller, the system design was for MFM, and user data bits were represented by the absence or the presence of these pulses at specific points in time while the controller was precisely synchronized to the flux reversal stream on the platter. While up to four drives can share a control cable, each drive has its own dedicated data cable connecting it to the hard disk controller (HDC). Most HDCs supported only two drives.

The control card translates requests for a particular track and sector from the host system into a sequence of head positioning commands, including setting the direction of head movement, in or out, and sending individual "STEP" commands to move. Four of the control cable pins, "HD SLCT 0" through "HD SLCT 3", allow the selection among up to 16 heads, although only four are available on the two-platter ST-506. The original ST-506/ST-412 interface defined only two HD SLCT lines, providing supporting for only four heads, but a third HD SLCT line was shortly added to the design; a fourth was added a not much later by redefining the reduced Write Current signal, needed only by very early drives, as HD SLCT 3. Once the heads are properly positioned and the appropriate head is selected, data is read or written serially through a set of pins in the data cable. The limited bandwidth of the data cable was not an issue at the time and is not the factor that limited the performance of the system. However, the unshielded cable can sometimes be susceptible to high levels of noise.

Like a floppy drive interface, ST-506 moves the drive head one track at a time with a timed pulse, which cannot occur faster than the stepper motor can move the head. The ST-412 disk drive, among other improvements, added buffered seek capability to the interface. The controller sends the required STEP pulses to the drive as fast as it can receive them. The ST506 disk drive without buffered seek averages 170 ms (similar to a floppy drive or modern optical drive) while the mechanically very similar ST-412 disk drive with buffered seek averages 85 ms. By the late 1980s, drives with an ST-412 interface were capable of average seek times between 15 and 30 milliseconds.

The process of moving portions of the command interpretation off the controller card and onto the drive itself in order to improve performance is a common feature of later hard drive connection schemes, notably SCSI, with its rich command set, and the storage-focused IDE systems. IDE, in effect, is a system for extending the computer bus so the interface controller can be built into the drive unit rather than being plugged into the computer's backplane. This allows a single "controller" card—really just an interface card—to communicate with multiple dissimilar drives, while it also reduces latency and noise between the controller and drive hardware. Effectively, the roles are reversed: instead of the controller doing almost all of the complex processing and the drive just transferring encoded data between the magnetic disks and the controller, the drive does almost all of the complex processing and the "controller" just transfers decoded data between the drive and the host system. In these systems, the operational details of the drive, like head selection and seeking, are entirely hidden from the host and handled within the drive's dedicated controller. These became known as "smart" drives, while ST-506–like devices retroactively became known as "dumb".

While integrated controllers have many benefits, they also have a disadvantage: the mechanical drive (called the "head-disk assembly", or HDA) and the controller are effectively fused into a monolithic black box, so that if something goes wrong with the drive, it is nearly impossible to do anything about it—the data is usually irretrievably lost. With a separated controller and disk system like that of the ST-506 interface, sometimes the problem can be resolved by connecting the disk drive, containing the actual (perhaps very important) data, to another compatible controller. Furthermore, an ST-506 style interface makes it possible and easy not only to replace the controller without throwing away the data, but to get access to the analog data signals from the disk drive and process them through a special data recovery system that may be able to reconstruct data that a normal controller cannot read. Such data recovery techniques are much more difficult to execute on integrated drives, because the needed analog signals from the disk are not available at a standard interface and the internal data recording method, sector format, and disk organization of nearly every integrated drive model is different and secret.

== Compatible systems and developments ==
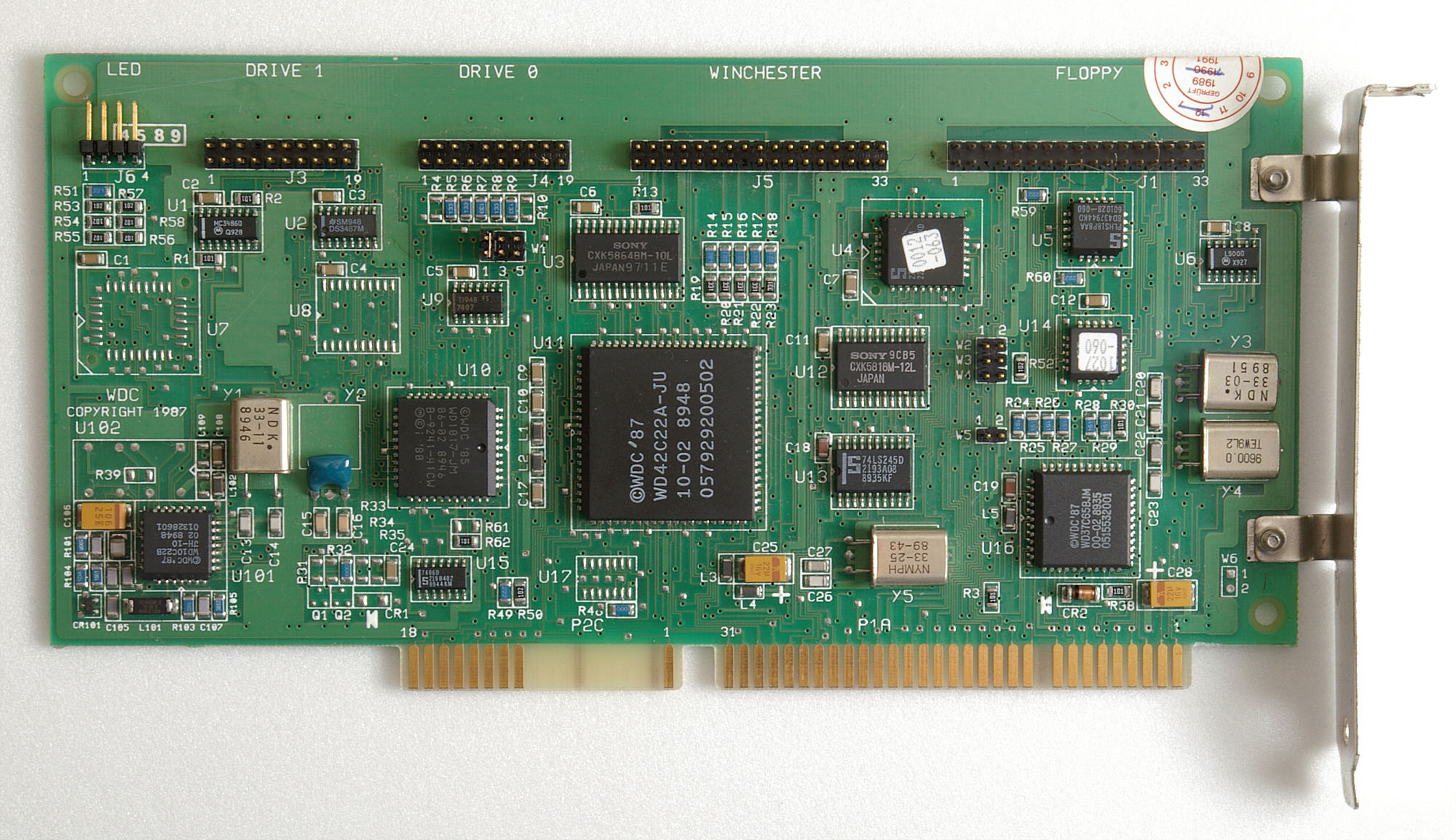
Western Digital WD1006

Many other companies quickly introduced drives using the same connectors and signals, creating a hard drive standard based on the ST-506. IBM chose to use it, acquiring adapter cards for the PC/XT from Xebec and for the PC/AT from Western Digital. As a consequence of IBM's endorsement, most of the drives in the 1980s were based on the ST-506. However, the complexity of the controller and cabling led to newer solutions like SCSI, and later, ATA (IDE). A few early SCSI drives were actually ST-506 drives with a SCSI to ST-506 controller on the bottom of the drive. Atari also used Adaptec ACB-4000A SCSI to ST-506 converter inside its own line of SH204/SH205 external ACSI drives. Likewise a few early IDE drives were just drives with an ST-412 interface attached to a controller board or chip. Ultimately all SCSI and ATA drives had built the controller into the drive, thereby eliminating the ST-506/412 interface in such models.

== Connector pinouts ==
From ST-506/ST-412 OEM manual. In the following tables, "~" denotes a negated (active low) signal.

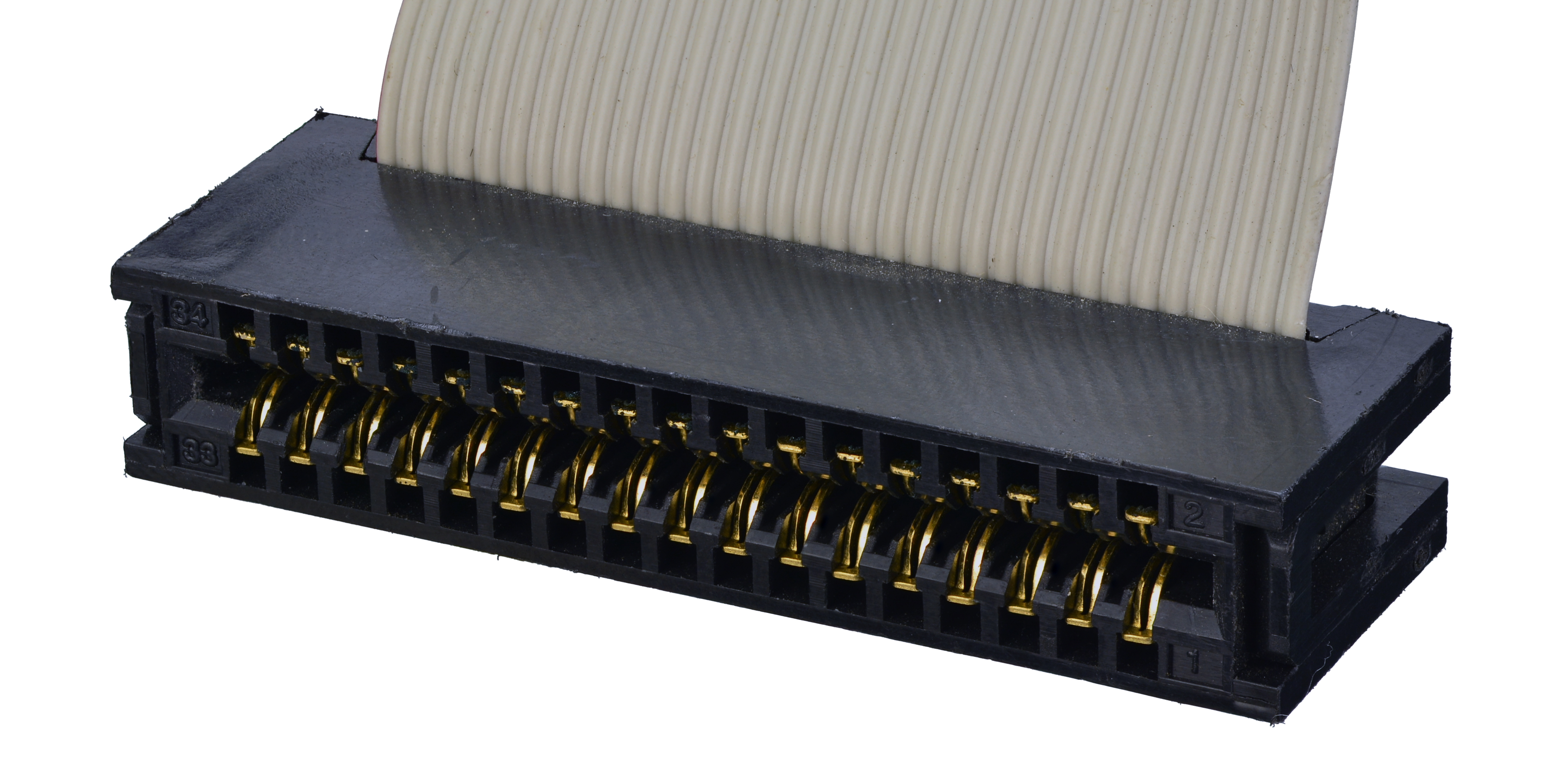
Control connector

Control connector pinout
GROUND	1	2	~HD SLCT 3 (or ~Reduced write current)
GROUND	3	4	~HD SLCT 2
GROUND	5	6	~WRITE GATE
GROUND	7	8	~SEEK CMPLT
GROUND	9	10	~TRACK 0
GROUND	11	12	~WRITE FAULT
GROUND	13	14	~HD SLCT 0
Key (no pin)	15	16	Reserved
GROUND	17	18	~HD SLCT 1
GROUND	19	20	~INDEX
GROUND	21	22	~READY
GROUND	23	24	~STEP
GROUND	25	26	~DRV SLCT 0
GROUND	27	28	~DRV SLCT 1
GROUND	29	30	~DRV SLCT 2
GROUND	31	32	~DRV SLCT 3
GROUND	33	34	~DIRECTION IN

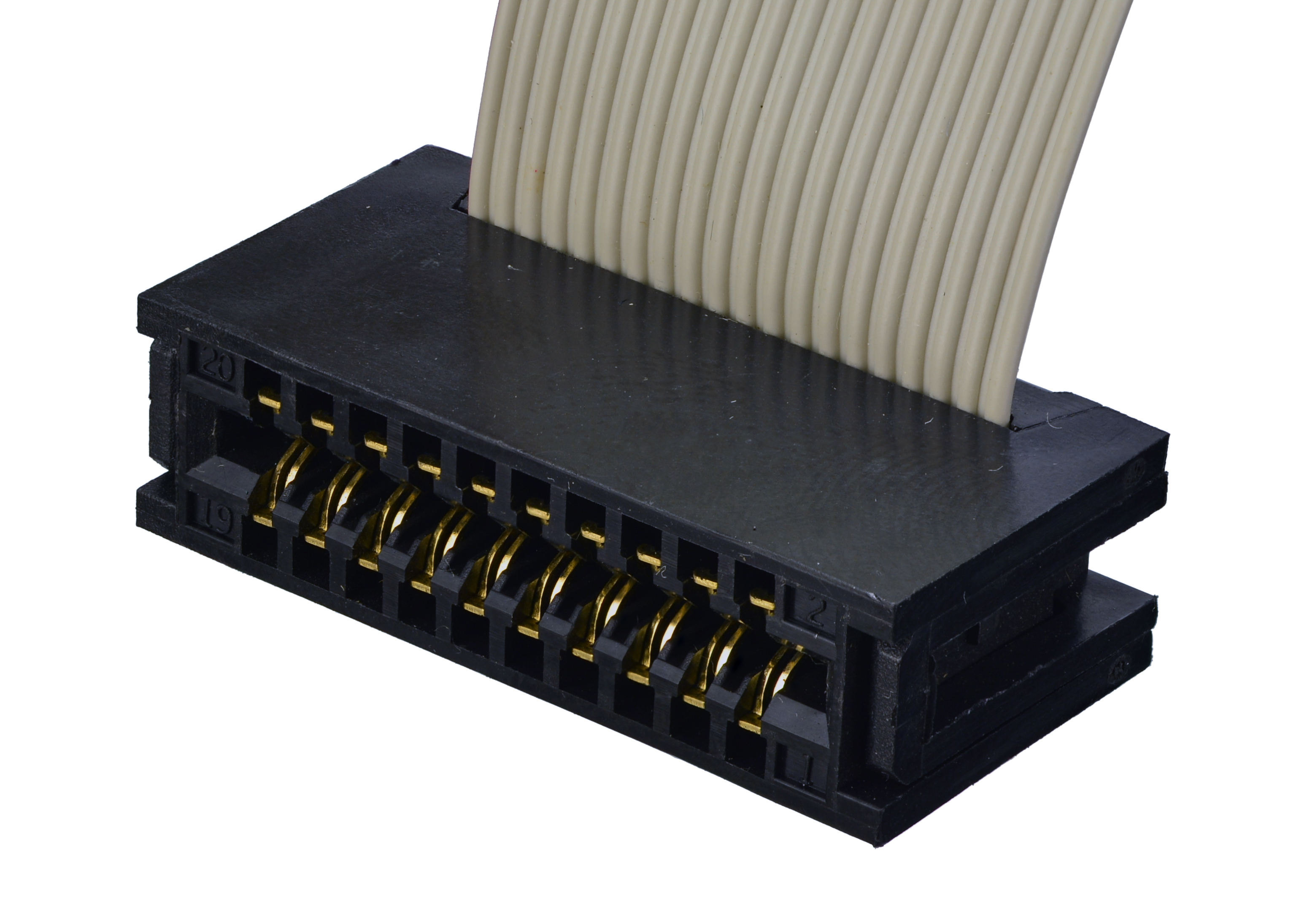
Data connector

Data connector pinout
~DRV SLCTD	1	2	GROUND
No connection	3	4	GROUND
No connection	5	6	GROUND
No connection	7	8	Key (no pin)
No connection	9	10	No connection
GROUND	11	12	GROUND
+MFM WRITE	13	14	−MFM WRITE
GROUND	15	16	GROUND
+MFM READ	17	18	−MFM READ
GROUND	19	20	GROUND

Power connector
Pin 1	+12 V DC
Pin 2	+12 V return
Pin 3	+5 V return
Pin 4	+5 V DC
