= Enhanced Small Disk Interface =

Disk interface

Enhanced Small Disk Interface (ESDI) is a hard disk drive interface designed by Maxtor Corporation in 1983 to be a follow-on to the ST-412/506 interface. ESDI improved on ST-506 by moving certain parts that were traditionally kept on the controller (such as the data separator) into the drives themselves, and also generalizing the control bus such that more kinds of devices (such as removable disks and tape drives) could be connected. ESDI uses the same cabling as ST-506 (one 34-pin common control cable, and a 20-pin data channel cable for each device), and thus could easily be retrofitted to ST-506 applications.

ESDI was popular in the mid-to-late 1980s, when SCSI and IDE technologies were young and immature, and ST-506 was neither fast nor flexible enough. ESDI could handle data rates of 10, 15, or 20 Mbit/s (as opposed to ST-506's top speed of 7.5 Mbit/s), and many high-end SCSI drives of the era were actually high-end ESDI drives with SCSI bridges integrated on the drive.

By 1990, SCSI had matured enough to handle high data rates and multiple types of drives, and ATA was quickly overtaking ST-506 in the desktop market. These two events made ESDI less and less important over time, and by the mid-1990s, ESDI was no longer in common use.

== Connector pinouts ==
ESDI 34-pin control connector pinout
GROUND	1	2	~HD SLCT 3
GROUND	3	4	~HD SLCT 2
GROUND	5	6	~WRITE GATE
GROUND	7	8	~CNFG/STATUS
GROUND	9	10	~XFER ACK
GROUND	11	12	~ATTENTION
GROUND	13	14	~HD SLCT 0
Key (no pin)	15	16	~SECTOR
GROUND	17	18	~HD SLCT 1
GROUND	19	20	~INDEX
GROUND	21	22	~READY
GROUND	23	24	~XFER REQ
GROUND	25	26	~DRV SLCT 0
GROUND	27	28	~DRV SLCT 1
GROUND	29	30	Reserved
GROUND	31	32	~READ GATE
GROUND	33	34	~CMD DATA

ESDI 20-pin data connector pinout
~DRV SLCTD	1	2	~SECTOR
~CMD COMPL	3	4	~ADDR MK EN
GROUND	5	6	GROUND
+WRITE CLK	7	8	−WRITE CLK
GROUND	9	10	+RD/REF CLK
−RD/REF CLK	11	12	GROUND
+NRZ WRITE	13	14	−NRZ WRITE
GROUND	15	16	GROUND
+NRZ READ	17	18	−NRZ READ
GROUND	19	20	~INDEX
