= List of IBM PS/2 models =

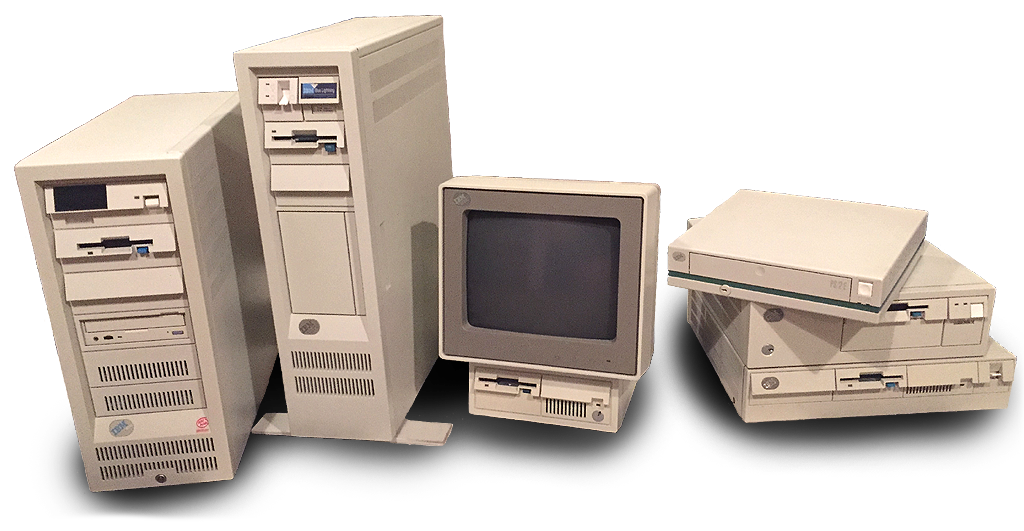
An assortment of IBM PS/2s in various form factors; from left to right: a Server 95, a Model 80, a Model 25, and a PS/2 E on top of a Model 56 and a Model 30 286

The Personal System/2 or PS/2 was a line of personal computers developed by International Business Machines Corporation (IBM). Released in 1987, the PS/2 represented IBM's second generation of personal computer following the original IBM PC series, which was retired following IBM's announcement of the PS/2 in April 1987. Most PS/2s featured the Micro Channel architecture bus—a closed standard which was IBM's attempt at recapturing control of the PC market. However some PS/2 models at the low end featured ISA buses, which IBM included with their earlier PCs and which were widely cloned due to being a mostly-open standard. Many models of PS/2 were made, which came in the form of desktops, towers, all-in-ones, portables, laptops and notebooks.

== Notes ==
Explanatory notes

- Submodels with IBM part numbers (P/N) denoting units manufactured and sold outside North America are excluded from this list.
- Built-in or optional monitors are CRTs unless mentioned otherwise.
- The Space Saving Keyboard is a 87-key numpad-less version of the Model M.
- The 25 Collegiate, intended for college students, had two 720 KB floppy drives, maxed out the RAM to 640 KB, and came packaged with the official PS/2 Mouse, Windows 2.0, and four blank floppy disks.
- Financial workstations came packaged with a 50-key function keypad and were intended for use in banks.
- LS models are "LAN Stations": essentially the same as their non-LS counterparts but without floppy drives or hard drives and that connect to networks using Ethernet or Token Ring adapters (in essence, diskless workstations).
- Ultimedia models shipped with a microphone and included SCSI CD-ROM drives, M-Audio sound adapter cards and volume controls and headphone and microphone jacks at the front of the case.
- Array models are PS/2 Servers with support for RAID.

Legend

ISA, 8-bit
ISA, 16-bit
Micro Channel, 16-bit
Micro Channel, 32-bit
MCA/ISA
Other

== Models ==
=== Main line ===
IBM PS/2 models
Model	IBM P/N	Processor	Clock speed (MHz)	Bus	No. of slots	No. of drive bays	FDD	HDD	Stock RAM	Maximum RAM	Video adapter	Monitor	Form factor	Date introduced	Notes	Ref(s).
25	8525-001	Intel 8086	8 (0 w)	ISA, 8-bit	2	2	one 720 KB	none	512 KB	640 KB	MCGA	12-in. monochrome	All-in-one	August 1987	Space Saving Keyboard	
25	8525-004	Intel 8086	8 (0 w)	ISA, 8-bit	2	2	one 720 KB	none	512 KB	640 KB	MCGA	12-in. color	All-in-one	August 1987	Space Saving Keyboard	
25	8525-G01	Intel 8086	8 (0 w)	ISA, 8-bit	2	2	one 720 KB	none	512 KB	640 KB	MCGA	12-in. monochrome	All-in-one	August 1987		
25	8525-G04	Intel 8086	8 (0 w)	ISA, 8-bit	2	2	one 720 KB	none	512 KB	640 KB	MCGA	12-in. color	All-in-one	August 1987		
25 Collegiate	8525-C02	Intel 8086	8 (0 w)	ISA, 8-bit	2	2	two 720 KB	none	640 KB	640 KB	MCGA	12-in. monochrome	All-in-one	August 1987	Space Saving Keyboard	
25 Collegiate	8525-C05	Intel 8086	8 (0 w)	ISA, 8-bit	2	2	two 720 KB	none	640 KB	640 KB	MCGA	12-in. color	All-in-one	August 1987	Space Saving Keyboard	
25 Collegiate	8525-K02	Intel 8086	8 (0 w)	ISA, 8-bit	2	2	two 720 KB	none	640 KB	640 KB	MCGA	12-in. monochrome	All-in-one	August 1987		
25 Collegiate	8525-K05	Intel 8086	8 (0 w)	ISA, 8-bit	2	2	two 720 KB	none	640 KB	640 KB	MCGA	12-in. color	All-in-one	August 1987		
25 LS	8525-L01	Intel 8086	8 (0 w)	ISA, 8-bit	2	2	one 720 KB	none	512 KB	640 KB	MCGA	12-in. monochrome	All-in-one	August 1987	Token Ring	
25 LS	8525-L04	Intel 8086	8 (0 w)	ISA, 8-bit	2	2	one 720 KB	none	512 KB	640 KB	MCGA	12-in. color	All-in-one	August 1987	Token Ring	
25 286	8525-006	Intel 80286	10 (1 w)	ISA, 16-bit	2	2	one 1.44 MB	none	1 MB	4 MB	VGA	12-in. color	All-in-one	October 1990	Space Saving Keyboard	
25 286	8525-036	Intel 80286	10 (1 w)	ISA, 16-bit	2	2	one 1.44 MB	30 MB (ST-506)	1 MB	4 MB	VGA	12-in. color	All-in-one	October 1990		
25 286	8525-G06	Intel 80286	10 (1 w)	ISA, 16-bit	2	2	one 1.44 MB	none	1 MB	4 MB	VGA	12-in. color	All-in-one	October 1990	Space Saving Keyboard	
25 286	8525-G36	Intel 80286	10 (1 w)	ISA, 16-bit	2	2	one 1.44 MB	30 MB (ST-506)	1 MB	4 MB	VGA	12-in. color	All-in-one	October 1990		
25 SX	8525-K00	Intel 386SX	20	ISA, 16-bit	3	2	one 1.44 MB	none	1 MB	16 MB	VGA	12-in. color	All-in-one	April 1992		
25 SX	8525-K01	Intel 386SX	20	ISA, 16-bit	3	2	one 1.44 MB	none	1 MB	16 MB	VGA	12-in. color	All-in-one	April 1992	Ethernet	
25 SX	8525-L02	Intel 386SX	20	ISA, 16-bit	3	2	one 1.44 MB	none	1 MB	16 MB	VGA	12-in. color	All-in-one	April 1992	Token Ring	
30	8530-001	Intel 8086	8 (0 w)	ISA, 8-bit	3	2	one 720 KB	none	640 KB	640 KB	MCGA	optional	Desktop	April 1989	Replaces the 8530-002	
30	8530-002	Intel 8086	8 (0 w)	ISA, 8-bit	3	2	two 720 KB	none	640 KB	640 KB	MCGA	optional	Desktop	April 1987		
30	8530-021	Intel 8086	8 (0 w)	ISA, 8-bit	3	2	one 720 KB	20 MB (ST-506)	640 KB	640 KB	MCGA	optional	Desktop	April 1987		
30	8530-R02	Intel 8086	8 (0 w)	ISA, 8-bit	3	2	two 720 KB	none	640 KB	640 KB	MCGA	optional	Desktop	November 1987	Financial workstation	
30	8530-R21	Intel 8086	8 (0 w)	ISA, 8-bit	3	2	one 720 KB	20 MB (ST-506)	640 KB	640 KB	MCGA	optional	Desktop	November 1987	Financial workstation	
30 286	8530-E01	Intel 80286	10 (1 w)	ISA, 16-bit	3	2	one 1.44 MB	none	512 KB	4 MB	VGA	optional	Desktop	September 1988		
30 286	8530-E21	Intel 80286	10 (1 w)	ISA, 16-bit	3	2	one 1.44 MB	20 MB (ST-506)	512 KB	4 MB	VGA	optional	Desktop	September 1988		
30 286	8530-E31	Intel 80286	10 (1 w)	ISA, 16-bit	3	2	one 1.44 MB	30 MB (ESDI)	512 KB	4 MB	VGA	optional	Desktop	September 1989		
30 286	8530-E41	Intel 80286	10 (1 w)	ISA, 16-bit	3	2	one 1.44 MB	40 MB (ESDI)	512 KB	4 MB	VGA	optional	Desktop	April 1991		
35 SX	8535-040	Intel 386SX	20 (0–2 w)	ISA, 16-bit	3	2	one 1.44 MB	none	2 MB	4 MB	VGA	optional	Desktop	June 1991		
35 SX	8535-043	Intel 386SX	20 (0–2 w)	ISA, 16-bit	3	2	one 1.44 MB	40 MB (IDE)	2 MB	4 MB	VGA	optional	Desktop	June 1991		
35 SX	8535-045	Intel 386SX	20 (0–2 w)	ISA, 16-bit	3	2	one 1.44 MB	80 MB (IDE)	2 MB	4 MB	VGA	optional	Desktop	Unknown		
35 LS	8535-14X	Intel 386SX	20	ISA, 16-bit	3	2	none	none	2 MB	4 MB	VGA	optional	Desktop	June 1991	Ethernet	
35 LS	8535-24X	Intel 386SX	20	ISA, 16-bit	3	2	none	none	2 MB	4 MB	VGA	optional	Desktop	June 1991	Token Ring	
35 SLC	8535-050	IBM 386SLC	20 (0 w)	ISA, 16-bit	3	2	one 2.88 MB	none	2 MB	16 MB	VGA	optional	Desktop	April 1992		
35 SLC	8535-053	IBM 386SLC	20 (0 w)	ISA, 16-bit	3	2	one 1.44 MB	80 MB (IDE)	2 MB	16 MB	VGA	optional	Desktop	April 1992		
35 SLC	8535-055	IBM 386SLC	20 (0 w)	ISA, 16-bit	3	2	one 2.88 MB	80 MB (IDE)	2 MB	16 MB	VGA	optional	Desktop	April 1992		
40 SX	8540-040	Intel 386SX	20 (0–2 w)	ISA, 16-bit	5	4	one 1.44 MB	none	2 MB	16 MB	VGA	optional	Desktop	June 1991		
40 SX	8540-043	Intel 386SX	20 (0–2 w)	ISA, 16-bit	5	4	one 1.44 MB	40 MB (IDE)	2 MB	16 MB	VGA	optional	Desktop	June 1991		
40 SX	8540-045	Intel 386SX	20 (0–2 w)	ISA, 16-bit	5	4	one 1.44 MB	80 MB (IDE)	2 MB	16 MB	VGA	optional	Desktop	June 1991		
40 SLC	8540-050	IBM 386SLC	20 (0 w)	ISA, 16-bit	5	4	one 1.44 MB	none	2 MB	16 MB	VGA	optional	Desktop	April 1992		
40 SLC	8540-055	IBM 386SLC	20 (0 w)	ISA, 16-bit	5	4	one 1.44 MB	80 MB (IDE)	2 MB	16 MB	VGA	optional	Desktop	April 1992		
50	8550-021	Intel 80286	10 (1 w)	MCA, 16-bit	4	3	one 1.44 MB	20 MB (ST-506)	1 MB	1 MB	VGA	optional	Desktop	April 1987		
50 Z	8550-031	Intel 80286	10 (0 w)	MCA, 16-bit	4	3	one 1.44 MB	30 MB (ST-506)	1 MB	2 MB	VGA	optional	Desktop	June 1988		
50 Z	8550-061	Intel 80286	10 (0 w)	MCA, 16-bit	4	3	one 1.44 MB	60 MB (ESDI)	1 MB	2 MB	VGA	optional	Desktop	June 1988		
55 SX	8555-031	Intel 386SX	16 (0–2 w)	MCA, 16-bit	3	2	one 1.44 MB	30 MB (ESDI)	2 MB	8 MB	VGA	optional	Desktop	May 1989		
55 SX	8555-041	Intel 386SX	16 (0–2 w)	MCA, 16-bit	3	2	one 1.44 MB	40 MB (ESDI)	2 MB	8 MB	VGA	optional	Desktop	June 1991		
55 SX	8555-061	Intel 386SX	16 (0–2 w)	MCA, 16-bit	3	2	one 1.44 MB	60 MB (ESDI)	2 MB	8 MB	VGA	optional	Desktop	May 1989		
55 SX	8555-081	Intel 386SX	16 (0–2 w)	MCA, 16-bit	3	2	one 1.44 MB	80 MB (ESDI)	2 MB	8 MB	VGA	optional	Desktop	June 1991		
55 LS	8555-LE0	Intel 386SX	16 (0–2 w)	MCA, 16-bit	3	2	none	none	2 MB	8 MB	VGA	optional	Desktop	October 1990		
55 LS	8555-LT0	Intel 386SX	16 (0–2 w)	MCA, 16-bit	3	2	none	none	2 MB	8 MB	VGA	optional	Desktop	October 1990		
56 SX	8556-043	Intel 386SX	20	MCA, 16-bit	3	2	one 2.88 MB	40 MB (SCSI)	4 MB	8 MB	VGA	optional	Desktop	February 1992		
56 SX	8556-045	Intel 386SX	20	MCA, 16-bit	3	3	one 2.88 MB	80 MB (SCSI)	4 MB	8 MB	VGA	optional	Desktop	February 1992		
56 SX	8556-049	Intel 386SX	20	MCA, 16-bit	3	3	one 2.88 MB	160 MB (SCSI)	4 MB	8 MB	VGA	optional	Desktop	February 1992		
56 LS	8556-14X	Intel 386SX	20	MCA, 16-bit	3	3	none	none	4 MB	8 MB	VGA	optional	Desktop	February 1992	Ethernet	
56 LS	8556-24X	Intel 386SX	20	MCA, 16-bit	3	3	none	none	4 MB	8 MB	VGA	optional	Desktop	February 1992	Token Ring	
56 SLC	8556-053	IBM 386SLC	20	MCA, 16-bit	3	2	one 2.88 MB	40 MB (SCSI)	4 MB	16 MB	VGA	optional	Desktop	Unknown		
56 SLC	8556-055	IBM 386SLC	20	MCA, 16-bit	3	2	one 2.88 MB	80 MB (SCSI)	4 MB	16 MB	VGA	optional	Desktop	February 1992		
56 SLC	8556-059	IBM 386SLC	20	MCA, 16-bit	3	2	one 2.88 MB	160 MB (SCSI)	4 MB	16 MB	VGA	optional	Desktop	February 1992		
56 SLC LS	8556-25X	IBM 386SLC	20	MCA, 16-bit	3	2	none	none	4 MB	16 MB	VGA	optional	Desktop	February 1992	Token Ring	
56 SLC LS	8556-15X	IBM 386SLC	20	MCA, 16-bit	3	2	none	none	4 MB	16 MB	VGA	optional	Desktop	February 1992	Ethernet	
57 SX	8557-045	Intel 386SX	20	MCA, 16-bit	5	4	one 2.88 MB	80 MB (SCSI)	4 MB	16 MB	VGA	optional	Desktop	June 1991		
57 SX	8557-049	Intel 386SX	20	MCA, 16-bit	5	4	one 2.88 MB	160 MB (SCSI)	4 MB	16 MB	VGA	optional	Desktop	June 1991		
57 SLC	8557-055	IBM 386SLC	20	MCA, 16-bit	5	4	one 2.88 MB	80 MB (SCSI)	4 MB	16 MB	VGA	optional	Desktop	February 1992	Token Ring	
57 SLC	8557-059	IBM 386SLC	20	MCA, 16-bit	5	4	one 2.88 MB	160 MB (SCSI)	8 MB	16 MB	VGA	optional	Desktop	February 1992		
57 SLC	8557-05F	IBM 386SLC	20	MCA, 16-bit	5	4	one 2.88 MB	400 MB (SCSI)	8 MB	16 MB	VGA	optional	Desktop	February 1992		
Ultimedia M57 SLC	8557-255	IBM 386SLC	20	MCA, 16-bit	5	4	one 2.88 MB	80 MB (SCSI)	4 MB	16 MB	VGA	optional	Desktop	February 1992		
Ultimedia M57 SLC	8557-259	IBM 386SLC	20	MCA, 16-bit	5	4	one 2.88 MB	160 MB (SCSI)	4 MB	16 MB	VGA	optional	Desktop	February 1992		
60	8560-041	Intel 80286	10 (1 w)	MCA, 16-bit	8	4	one 1.44 MB	44 MB (ST-506)	1 MB	7 MB	VGA	optional	Tower	April 1987		
60	8560-071	Intel 80286	10 (1 w)	MCA, 16-bit	8	4	one 1.44 MB	70 MB (ESDI)	1 MB	7 MB	VGA	optional	Tower	April 1987		
65 SX	8565-061	Intel 386SX	16	MCA, 16-bit	8	4	one 1.44 MB	60 MB (SCSI)	2 MB	8 MB	VGA	optional	Tower	March 1990		
65 SX	8565-121	Intel 386SX	16	MCA, 16-bit	8	4	one 1.44 MB	120 MB (SCSI)	2 MB	8 MB	VGA	optional	Tower	March 1990		
65 SX	8565-321	Intel 386SX	16	MCA, 16-bit	8	4	one 1.44 MB	320 MB (SCSI)	2 MB	8 MB	VGA	optional	Tower	October 1990		
70 386	8570-061	Intel 386	20	MCA, 32-bit	3	3	one 1.44 MB	60 MB (ESDI)	2 MB	6 MB	VGA	optional	Desktop	September 1989		
70 386	8570-081	Intel 386	20	MCA, 32-bit	3	3	one 1.44 MB	60 MB (ESDI)	4 MB	6 MB	VGA	optional	Desktop	June 1991		
70 386	8570-121	Intel 386	20	MCA, 32-bit	3	3	one 1.44 MB	120 MB (ESDI)	2 MB	6 MB	VGA	optional	Desktop	June 1988		
70 386	8570-161	Intel 386	20	MCA, 32-bit	3	3	one 1.44 MB	160 MB (ESDI)	4 MB	6 MB	VGA	optional	Desktop	June 1991		
70 386	8570-A16	Intel 386	25	MCA, 32-bit	3	3	one 1.44 MB	160 MB (ESDI)	4 MB	6 MB	VGA	optional	Desktop	June 1991		
70 386	8570-A21	Intel 386	25	MCA, 32-bit	3	3	one 1.44 MB	120 MB (ESDI)	2 MB	6 MB	VGA	optional	Desktop	December 1988		
70 386	8570-A61	Intel 386	25	MCA, 32-bit	3	3	one 1.44 MB	60 MB (ESDI)	2 MB	6 MB	VGA	optional	Desktop	September 1989		
70 386	8570-A81	Intel 386	25	MCA, 32-bit	3	3	one 1.44 MB	80 MB (ESDI)	4 MB	6 MB	VGA	optional	Desktop	June 1991		
70 386	8570-E61	Intel 386	16	MCA, 32-bit	3	3	one 1.44 MB	60 MB (ESDI)	1 MB	6 MB	VGA	optional	Desktop	June 1988		
70 486	8570-B21	Intel 486	25	MCA, 32-bit	3	3	one 1.44 MB	120 MB (ESDI)	2 MB	8 MB	VGA	optional	Desktop	December 1989		
70 486	8570-B61	Intel 486	25	MCA, 32-bit	3	3	one 1.44 MB	60 MB (ESDI)	2 MB	8 MB	VGA	optional	Desktop	December 1989		
80	8580-041	Intel 386	16	MCA, 32-bit	8	5/6	one 1.44 MB	44 MB (ST-506)	1 MB	2 MB	VGA	optional	Tower	July 1987		
80	8580-071	Intel 386	16	MCA, 32-bit	8	5/6	one 1.44 MB	70 MB (ESDI)	1 MB	2 MB	VGA	optional	Tower	July 1987		
80	8580-081	Intel 386	20	MCA, 32-bit	8	5/6	one 1.44 MB	80 MB (SCSI)	2 MB	4 MB	VGA	optional	Tower	October 1990		
80	8580-111	Intel 386	20	MCA, 32-bit	8	5/6	one 1.44 MB	115 MB (ESDI)	2 MB	4 MB	VGA	optional	Tower	November 1987		
80	8580-121	Intel 386	20	MCA, 32-bit	8	5/6	one 1.44 MB	120 MB (SCSI)	2 MB	4 MB	VGA	optional	Tower	March 1990		
80	8580-161	Intel 386	20	MCA, 32-bit	8	5/6	one 1.44 MB	160 MB (SCSI)	2 MB	4 MB	VGA	optional	Tower	October 1990		
80	8580-311	Intel 386	20	MCA, 32-bit	8	5/6	one 1.44 MB	314 MB (ESDI)	2 MB	4 MB	VGA	optional	Tower	January 1988		
80	8580-321	Intel 386	20	MCA, 32-bit	8	5/6	one 1.44 MB	320 MB (SCSI)	2 MB	4 MB	VGA	optional	Tower	March 1990		
80	8580-A16	Intel 386	25	MCA, 32-bit	8	5/6	one 1.44 MB	160 MB (SCSI)	4 MB	8 MB	VGA	optional	Tower	October 1990		
80	8580-A21	Intel 386	25	MCA, 32-bit	8	5/6	one 1.44 MB	120 MB (SCSI)	4 MB	8 MB	VGA	optional	Tower	March 1990		
80	8580-A31	Intel 386	25	MCA, 32-bit	8	5/6	one 1.44 MB	320 MB (SCSI)	4 MB	8 MB	VGA	optional	Tower	March 1990		
53 486SLC2	9553-0B7	IBM 486SLC2	50	MCA, 16-bit	3	3	one 1.44 MB	120 MB (IDE)	4 MB	16 MB	SVGA	optional	Desktop	November 1993	Reply board	
53 486SLC2	9553-0BB	IBM 486SLC2	50	MCA, 16-bit	3	3	one 1.44 MB	250 MB (IDE)	4 MB	16 MB	SVGA	optional	Desktop	November 1993	Reply board	
53 LS	9553-1BX	IBM 486SLC2	50	MCA, 16-bit	3	3	none	none	4 MB	16 MB	SVGA	optional	Desktop	November 1993	Reply board, Ethernet	
53 LS	9553-2BX	IBM 486SLC2	50	MCA, 16-bit	3	3	none	none	4 MB	16 MB	SVGA	optional	Desktop	November 1993	Reply board, Token Ring	
56 486SLC2	9556-0B6	IBM 486SLC2	50	MCA, 16-bit	3	2	one 2.88 MB	104 MB (SCSI)	8 MB	16 MB	XGA-2	optional	Desktop	September 1992		
56 486SLC2	9556-0BA	IBM 486SLC2	50	MCA, 16-bit	3	2	one 2.88 MB	212 MB (SCSI)	8 MB	16 MB	XGA-2	optional	Desktop	September 1992		
56 486SLC2	9556-1BX	IBM 486SLC2	50	MCA, 16-bit	3	2	one 2.88 MB	none	4 MB	16 MB	XGA-2	optional	Desktop	Unknown	Ethernet	
56 486SLC2	9556-2BX	IBM 486SLC2	50	MCA, 16-bit	3	2	one 2.88 MB	none	4 MB	16 MB	XGA-2	optional	Desktop	Unknown	Token Ring	
56 486SLC2	9556-ABX	IBM 486SLC2	50	MCA, 16-bit	3	2	one 2.88 MB	none	4 MB	16 MB	XGA-2	optional	Desktop	Unknown		
56 486SLC2	9556-DB6	IBM 486SLC2	50	MCA, 16-bit	3	2	one 2.88 MB	104 MB (SCSI)	8 MB	16 MB	XGA-2	optional	Desktop	October 1992		
56 486SLC2	9556-DBA	IBM 486SLC2	50	MCA, 16-bit	3	2	one 2.88 MB	212 MB (SCSI)	8 MB	16 MB	XGA-2	optional	Desktop	October 1992		
56 486SLC2	9556-KB6	IBM 486SLC2	50	MCA, 16-bit	3	2	one 2.88 MB	104 MB (SCSI)	8 MB	16 MB	XGA-2	optional	Desktop	May 1993		
56 486SLC2	9556-KBA	IBM 486SLC2	50	MCA, 16-bit	3	2	one 2.88 MB	212 MB (SCSI)	8 MB	16 MB	XGA-2	optional	Desktop	May 1993		
56 486SLC2	9556-QB6	IBM 486SLC2	50	MCA, 16-bit	3	2	one 2.88 MB	104 MB (SCSI)	8 MB	16 MB	XGA-2	optional	Desktop	May 1993		
56 486SLC2	9556-QBA	IBM 486SLC2	50	MCA, 16-bit	3	2	one 2.88 MB	212 MB (SCSI)	8 MB	16 MB	XGA-2	optional	Desktop	May 1993		
56 486SLC3	9556-DE9	IBM 486SLC3	75	MCA, 16-bit	3	3	one 2.88 MB	170 MB (SCSI)	8 MB	16 MB	XGA-2	optional	Desktop	February 1994		
56 486SLC3	9556-DEB	IBM 486SLC3	75	MCA, 16-bit	3	3	one 2.88 MB	270 MB (SCSI)	8 MB	16 MB	XGA-2	optional	Desktop	February 1994		
56 486SLC3	9556-DED	IBM 486SLC3	75	MCA, 16-bit	3	3	one 2.88 MB	340 MB (SCSI)	8 MB	16 MB	XGA-2	optional	Desktop	February 1994		
56 486SLC3 LS	9556-1EX	IBM 486SLC3	75	MCA, 16-bit	3	3	none	none	4 MB	16 MB	XGA-2	optional	Desktop	February 1994	Ethernet	
56 486SLC3 LS	9556-2EX	IBM 486SLC3	75	MCA, 16-bit	3	3	none	none	4 MB	16 MB	XGA-2	optional	Desktop	February 1994	Token Ring	
57 486SLC2	9557-0B6	IBM 486SLC2	50	MCA, 16-bit	5	4	one 2.88 MB	104 MB (SCSI)	8 MB	16 MB	XGA-2	optional	Desktop	September 1992		
57 486SLC2	9557-0BA	IBM 486SLC2	50	MCA, 16-bit	5	4	one 2.88 MB	212 MB (SCSI)	8 MB	16 MB	XGA-2	optional	Desktop	September 1992		
57 486SLC2	9557-0BF	IBM 486SLC2	50	MCA, 16-bit	5	4	one 2.88 MB	400 MB (SCSI)	8 MB	16 MB	XGA-2	optional	Desktop	Unknown		
57 486SLC2	9557-0BG	IBM 486SLC2	50	MCA, 16-bit	5	4	one 2.88 MB	540 MB (SCSI)	8 MB	16 MB	XGA-2	optional	Desktop	Unknown		
Ultimedia M57 486SLC2	9557-1BA	IBM 486SLC2	50	MCA, 16-bit	5	4	one 2.88 MB	212 MB (SCSI)	8 MB	16 MB	XGA-2	optional	Desktop	September 1992		
Ultimedia M57 486SLC2	9557-2BA	IBM 486SLC2	50	MCA, 16-bit	5	4	one 2.88 MB	212 MB (SCSI)	8 MB	16 MB	XGA-2	optional	Desktop	September 1992	ActionMedia II Adapter	
57 486SLC2	9557-DB6	IBM 486SLC2	50	MCA, 16-bit	5	4	one 2.88 MB	104 MB (SCSI)	8 MB	16 MB	XGA-2	optional	Desktop	October 1992		
57 486SLC2	9557-DBA	IBM 486SLC2	50	MCA, 16-bit	5	4	one 2.88 MB	212 MB (SCSI)	8 MB	16 MB	XGA-2	optional	Desktop	October 1992		
57 486SLC2	9557-DBG	IBM 486SLC2	50	MCA, 16-bit	5	4	one 2.88 MB	540 MB (SCSI)	8 MB	16 MB	XGA-2	optional	Desktop	July 1993		
57 486SLC2	9557-KB6	IBM 486SLC2	50	MCA, 16-bit	5	4	one 2.88 MB	104 MB (SCSI)	8 MB	16 MB	XGA-2	optional	Desktop	July 1993		
57 486SLC2	9557-KBA	IBM 486SLC2	50	MCA, 16-bit	5	4	one 2.88 MB	212 MB (SCSI)	8 MB	16 MB	XGA-2	optional	Desktop	July 1993		
57 486SLC2	9557-KBG	IBM 486SLC2	50	MCA, 16-bit	5	4	one 2.88 MB	540 MB (SCSI)	8 MB	16 MB	XGA-2	optional	Desktop	July 1993		
57 486SLC2	9557-QB6	IBM 486SLC2	50	MCA, 16-bit	5	4	one 2.88 MB	104 MB (SCSI)	8 MB	16 MB	XGA-2	optional	Desktop	April 1993		
57 486SLC2	9557-QBA	IBM 486SLC2	50	MCA, 16-bit	5	4	one 2.88 MB	212 MB (SCSI)	8 MB	16 MB	XGA-2	optional	Desktop	April 1993		
57 486SLC2	9557-V01	IBM 486SLC2	50	MCA, 16-bit	5	4	one 2.88 MB	2×212 MB (SCSI)	8 MB	16 MB	XGA-2	optional	Desktop	June 1992		
57 486SLC2	9557-xEB	IBM 486SLC2	50	MCA, 16-bit	5	4	one 2.88 MB	245 MB (SCSI)	8 MB	16 MB	XGA-2	optional	Desktop	January 1994		
57 486SLC2	9557-xEG	IBM 486SLC2	50	MCA, 16-bit	5	4	one 2.88 MB	540 MB (SCSI)	8 MB	16 MB	XGA-2	optional	Desktop	January 1994		
57 486SLC3	9557-DE9	IBM 486SLC3	75	MCA, 16-bit	5	5	one 2.88 MB	270 MB (SCSI)	8 MB	16 MB	XGA-2	optional	Desktop	February 1994		
57 486SLC3	9557-DEB	IBM 486SLC3	75	MCA, 16-bit	5	5	one 2.88 MB	540 MB (SCSI)	8 MB	16 MB	XGA-2	optional	Desktop	February 1994		
57 486SLC3	9557-DED	IBM 486SLC3	75	MCA, 16-bit	5	5	one 2.88 MB	270 MB (SCSI)	8 MB	16 MB	XGA-2	optional	Desktop	February 1994	Includes CD-ROM and audio card	
57 486SLC3	9557-DEG	IBM 486SLC3	75	MCA, 16-bit	5	5	one 2.88 MB	540 MB (SCSI)	8 MB	16 MB	XGA-2	optional	Desktop	February 1994	Includes CD-ROM and audio card	
76 486	9576-0U6	Intel 486SX	33	MCA, 32-bit	3	3	one 2.88 MB	104 MB (SCSI)	8 MB	32 MB	XGA-2	optional	Desktop	September 1992		
76 486	9576-0UA	Intel 486SX	33	MCA, 32-bit	3	3	one 2.88 MB	212 MB (SCSI)	8 MB	32 MB	XGA-2	optional	Desktop	September 1992		
76 486	9576-DU6	Intel 486SX	33	MCA, 32-bit	3	3	one 2.88 MB	104 MB (SCSI)	8 MB	32 MB	XGA-2	optional	Desktop	August 1993		
76 486	9576-DUA	Intel 486SX	33	MCA, 32-bit	3	3	one 2.88 MB	212 MB (SCSI)	8 MB	32 MB	XGA-2	optional	Desktop	August 1993		
76 486	9576-KU6	Intel 486SX	33	MCA, 32-bit	3	3	one 2.88 MB	104 MB (SCSI)	8 MB	32 MB	XGA-2	optional	Desktop	May 1993		
76 486	9576-KUA	Intel 486SX	33	MCA, 32-bit	3	3	one 2.88 MB	212 MB (SCSI)	8 MB	32 MB	XGA-2	optional	Desktop	May 1993		
76 486	9576-QU6	Intel 486SX	33	MCA, 32-bit	3	3	one 2.88 MB	104 MB (SCSI)	8 MB	32 MB	XGA-2	optional	Desktop	May 1993		
76 486	9576-QUA	Intel 486SX	33	MCA, 32-bit	3	3	one 2.88 MB	212 MB (SCSI)	8 MB	32 MB	XGA-2	optional	Desktop	May 1993		
76i	9576-ANB	Intel 486DX2	66	MCA, 32-bit	3	3	one 2.88 MB	270 MB (IDE)	8 MB	64 MB	S3 928 (VLB)	optional	Desktop	June 1994	IDE (VLB)	
76i	9576-ATB	Intel 486DX4	100	MCA, 32-bit	3	3	one 2.88 MB	270 MB (IDE)	8 MB	64 MB	S3 928 (VLB)	optional	Desktop	June 1994	IDE (VLB)	
76i	9576-AU9	Intel 486SX	33	MCA, 32-bit	3	3	one 2.88 MB	170 MB (IDE)	8 MB	64 MB	S3 928 (VLB)	optional	Desktop	June 1994	IDE (VLB)	
76i	9576-AUB	Intel 486SX	33	MCA, 32-bit	3	3	one 2.88 MB	270 MB (IDE)	8 MB	64 MB	S3 928 (VLB)	optional	Desktop	June 1994	IDE (VLB)	
76s	9576-BNB	Intel 486DX2	66	MCA, 32-bit	3	3	one 2.88 MB	270 MB (SCSI)	8 MB	64 MB	S3 928 (VLB)	optional	Desktop	June 1994	SCSI	
76s	9576-BTB	Intel 486DX4	100	MCA, 32-bit	3	3	one 2.88 MB	270 MB (SCSI)	8 MB	64 MB	S3 928 (VLB)	optional	Desktop	June 1994	SCSI	
76s	9576-BUB	Intel 486SX	33	MCA, 32-bit	3	3	one 2.88 MB	270 MB (SCSI)	8 MB	64 MB	S3 928 (VLB)	optional	Desktop	June 1994	SCSI	
77 486	9577-0UA	Intel 486SX	33	MCA, 32-bit	5	4	one 2.88 MB	400 MB (SCSI)	8 MB	32 MB	XGA-2	optional	Desktop	October 1992		
77 486	9577-0UF	Intel 486SX	33	MCA, 32-bit	5	4	one 2.88 MB	212 MB (SCSI)	8 MB	32 MB	XGA-2	optional	Desktop	October 1992		
77 486	9577-DU6	Intel 486SX	33	MCA, 32-bit	5	4	one 2.88 MB	104 MB (SCSI)	8 MB	32 MB	XGA-2	optional	Desktop	Unknown		
77 486	9577-DUA	Intel 486SX	33	MCA, 32-bit	5	4	one 2.88 MB	212 MB (SCSI)	8 MB	32 MB	XGA-2	optional	Desktop	July 1993		
77 486	9577-DUG	Intel 486SX	33	MCA, 32-bit	5	4	one 2.88 MB	540 MB (SCSI)	8 MB	32 MB	XGA-2	optional	Desktop	July 1993		
77 486	9577-KUA	Intel 486SX	33	MCA, 32-bit	5	4	one 2.88 MB	212 MB (SCSI)	8 MB	32 MB	XGA-2	optional	Desktop	May 1993		
77 486	9577-KUF	Intel 486SX	33	MCA, 32-bit	5	4	one 2.88 MB	400 MB (SCSI)	8 MB	32 MB	XGA-2	optional	Desktop	May 1993		
77 486	9577-KUG	Intel 486SX	33	MCA, 32-bit	5	4	one 2.88 MB	540 MB (SCSI)	8 MB	32 MB	XGA-2	optional	Desktop	May 1993		
77 486	9577-QUA	Intel 486SX	33	MCA, 32-bit	5	4	one 2.88 MB	212 MB (SCSI)	8 MB	32 MB	XGA-2	optional	Desktop	May 1993		
77 486DX2	9577-0NA	Intel 486DX2	66	MCA, 32-bit	5	4	one 2.88 MB	212 MB (SCSI)	8 MB	32 MB	XGA-2	optional	Desktop	October 1992		
77 486DX2	9577-0NF	Intel 486DX2	66	MCA, 32-bit	5	4	one 2.88 MB	400 MB (SCSI)	8 MB	32 MB	XGA-2	optional	Desktop	October 1992		
77 486DX2	9577-DNA	Intel 486DX2	66	MCA, 32-bit	3	3	one 2.88 MB	212 MB (SCSI)	8 MB	32 MB	XGA-2	optional	Desktop	July 1993		
77 486DX2	9577-DNG	Intel 486DX2	66	MCA, 32-bit	3	3	one 2.88 MB	540 MB (SCSI)	8 MB	32 MB	XGA-2	optional	Desktop	July 1993		
77 486DX2	9577-KNA	Intel 486DX2	66	MCA, 32-bit	3	3	one 2.88 MB	212 MB (SCSI)	8 MB	32 MB	XGA-2	optional	Desktop	May 1993		
77 486DX2	9577-KNG	Intel 486DX2	66	MCA, 32-bit	3	3	one 2.88 MB	540 MB (SCSI)	8 MB	32 MB	XGA-2	optional	Desktop	May 1993		
77 486DX2	9577-QNA	Intel 486DX2	66	MCA, 32-bit	3	3	one 2.88 MB	212 MB (SCSI)	8 MB	32 MB	XGA-2	optional	Desktop	April 1993		
Ultimedia M77 486	9577-1UA	Intel 486SX	33	MCA, 32-bit	5	4	one 2.88 MB	212 MB (SCSI)	8 MB	32 MB	XGA-2	optional	Desktop	October 1992		
Ultimedia M77 486DX2	9577-1NA	Intel 486DX2	66	MCA, 32-bit	5	4	one 2.88 MB	212 MB (SCSI)	8 MB	32 MB	XGA-2	optional	Desktop	October 1992		
77i	9577-ANB	Intel 486DX2	66	MCA, 32-bit	5	4	one 2.88 MB	270 MB (IDE)	8 MB	64 MB	S3 928 (VLB)	optional	Desktop	June 1994		
77i	9577-ANG	Intel 486DX2	66	MCA, 32-bit	5	4	one 2.88 MB	527 MB (IDE)	8 MB	64 MB	S3 928 (VLB)	optional	Desktop	June 1994		
77i	9577-ATB	Intel 486DX4	100	MCA, 32-bit	5	4	one 2.88 MB	270 MB (IDE)	8 MB	64 MB	S3 928 (VLB)	optional	Desktop	June 1994		
77i	9577-ATG	Intel 486DX4	100	MCA, 32-bit	5	4	one 2.88 MB	527 MB (IDE)	8 MB	64 MB	S3 928 (VLB)	optional	Desktop	June 1994		
77i	9577-AUB	Intel 486SX	33	MCA, 32-bit	5	4	one 2.88 MB	270 MB (IDE)	8 MB	64 MB	S3 928 (VLB)	optional	Desktop	June 1994		
77s	9577-BNB	Intel 486DX2	66	MCA, 32-bit	5	4	one 2.88 MB	270 MB (SCSI)	8 MB	64 MB	S3 928 (VLB)	optional	Desktop	June 1994		
77s	9577-BNG	Intel 486DX2	66	MCA, 32-bit	5	4	one 2.88 MB	540 MB (SCSI)	8 MB	64 MB	S3 928 (VLB)	optional	Desktop	June 1994		
77s	9577-BTB	Intel 486DX4	100	MCA, 32-bit	5	4	one 2.88 MB	270 MB (SCSI)	8 MB	64 MB	S3 928 (VLB)	optional	Desktop	June 1994		
77s	9577-BTG	Intel 486DX4	100	MCA, 32-bit	5	4	one 2.88 MB	540 MB (SCSI)	8 MB	64 MB	S3 928 (VLB)	optional	Desktop	June 1994		
77s	9577-BUB	Intel 486SX	33	MCA, 32-bit	5	4	one 2.88 MB	270 MB (SCSI)	8 MB	64 MB	S3 928 (VLB)	optional	Desktop	June 1994		
77s	9577-xNB	Intel 486DX2	66	MCA, 32-bit	5	4	one 2.88 MB	270 MB (SCSI)	8 MB	64 MB	S3 928 (VLB)	optional	Desktop	June 1994		
77s	9577-xNG	Intel 486DX2	66	MCA, 32-bit	5	4	one 2.88 MB	540 MB (SCSI)	8 MB	64 MB	S3 928 (VLB)	optional	Desktop	June 1994		
77s	9577-xTG	Intel 486DX4	100	MCA, 32-bit	5	4	one 2.88 MB	540 MB (SCSI)	8 MB	64 MB	S3 928 (VLB)	optional	Desktop	June 1994		
77s	9577-6NB	Intel 486DX2	66	MCA, 32-bit	5	4	one 2.88 MB	270 MB (SCSI)	8 MB	64 MB	S3 928 (VLB)	optional	Desktop	November 1994	Multimedia, Windows	
77s	9577-7NB	Intel 486DX2	66	MCA, 32-bit	5	4	one 2.88 MB	270 MB (SCSI)	8 MB	64 MB	S3 928 (VLB)	optional	Desktop	November 1994	Multimedia, OS/2	
77s	9577-6NG	Intel 486DX2	66	MCA, 32-bit	5	4	one 2.88 MB	540 MB (SCSI)	8 MB	64 MB	S3 928 (VLB)	optional	Desktop	November 1994	Multimedia, Windows	
77s	9577-7NG	Intel 486DX2	66	MCA, 32-bit	5	4	one 2.88 MB	540 MB (SCSI)	8 MB	64 MB	S3 928 (VLB)	optional	Desktop	November 1994	Multimedia, OS/2	
77s	9577-6TG	Intel 486DX2	66	MCA, 32-bit	5	4	one 2.88 MB	540 MB (SCSI)	8 MB	64 MB	S3 928 (VLB)	optional	Desktop	November 1994	Multimedia, Windows, max. 256-KB L2 cache	
77s	9577-7TG	Intel 486DX2	66	MCA, 32-bit	5	4	one 2.88 MB	540 MB (SCSI)	8 MB	64 MB	S3 928 (VLB)	optional	Desktop	November 1994	Multimedia, OS/2, max. 256-KB L2 cache	
90 XP 486	8590-0G5	Intel 486SX	20	MCA, 32-bit	4	4	one 1.44 MB	80 MB (SCSI)	4 MB	64 MB	XGA	optional	Desktop	October 1990		
90 XP 486	8590-0G9	Intel 486SX	20	MCA, 32-bit	4	4	one 1.44 MB	160 MB (SCSI)	4 MB	64 MB	XGA	optional	Desktop	October 1990		
90 XP 486	8590-0H5	Intel 486SX	25	MCA, 32-bit	4	4	one 1.44 MB	80 MB (SCSI)	4 MB	64 MB	XGA	optional	Desktop	October 1990		
90 XP 486	8590-0H9	Intel 486SX	25	MCA, 32-bit	4	4	one 1.44 MB	160 MB (SCSI)	4 MB	64 MB	XGA	optional	Desktop	October 1990		
90 XP 486	8590-0J5	Intel 486	25	MCA, 32-bit	4	4	one 1.44 MB	80 MB (SCSI)	4 MB	64 MB	XGA	optional	Desktop	October 1990		
90 XP 486	8590-0J9	Intel 80486DX	25	MCA, 32-bit	4	4	one 1.44 MB	160 MB (SCSI)	4 MB	64 MB	XGA	optional	Desktop	October 1990		
90 XP 486	8590-0K9	Intel 80486DX	33	MCA, 32-bit	4	4	one 1.44 MB	320 MB (SCSI)	8 MB	64 MB	XGA	optional	Desktop	October 1991		
90 XP 486	8590-0KD	Intel 80486DX	33	MCA, 32-bit	4	4	one 1.44 MB	320 MB (SCSI)	4 MB	64 MB	XGA	optional	Desktop	October 1990		
90 XP 486	8590-0KF	Intel 80486DX	33	MCA, 32-bit	4	4	one 1.44 MB	400 MB (SCSI)	8 MB	64 MB	XGA	optional	Desktop	October 1991		
90 XP 486	8590-0L9	Intel 486DX2	50	MCA, 32-bit	4	4	one 2.88 MB	160 MB (SCSI)	8 MB	64 MB	XGA	optional	Desktop	April 1992		
90 XP 486	8590-0LF	Intel 486DX2	50	MCA, 32-bit	4	4	one 2.88 MB	400 MB (SCSI)	8 MB	64 MB	XGA	optional	Desktop	April 1992		
90 XP 486	9590-0LA	Intel 486DX2	50	MCA, 32-bit	4	4	one 2.88 MB	212 MB (SCSI)	8 MB	64 MB	XGA-2	optional	Desktop	March 1993		
90 XP 486	9590-0LF	Intel 486DX2	50	MCA, 32-bit	4	4	one 2.88 MB	400 MB (SCSI)	8 MB	64 MB	XGA-2	optional	Desktop	March 1993		
90 XP 486	9590-DLA	Intel 486DX2	50	MCA, 32-bit	4	4	one 2.88 MB	212 MB (SCSI)	8 MB	64 MB	XGA-2	optional	Desktop	March 1993	Windows 3.1	
90 XP 486	9590-DLG	Intel 486DX2	50	MCA, 32-bit	4	4	one 2.88 MB	540 MB (SCSI)	8 MB	64 MB	XGA-2	optional	Desktop	March 1993	Windows 3.1	
90 XP 486	9590-KLA	Intel 486DX2	50	MCA, 32-bit	4	4	one 2.88 MB	212 MB (SCSI)	8 MB	64 MB	XGA-2	optional	Desktop	March 1993	OS/2	
90 XP 486	9590-KLG	Intel 486DX2	50	MCA, 32-bit	4	4	one 2.88 MB	540 MB (SCSI)	8 MB	64 MB	XGA-2	optional	Desktop	March 1993	OS/2	
90 XP 486	9590-QLA	Intel 486DX2	50	MCA, 32-bit	4	4	one 2.88 MB	212 MB (SCSI)	8 MB	64 MB	XGA-2	optional	Desktop	April 1993	OS/2	
95 XP 486	8595-0G9	Intel 486SX	20	MCA, 32-bit	8	8	one 1.44 MB	160 MB (SCSI)	4 MB	64 MB	XGA	optional	Tower	October 1990		
95 XP 486	8595-0GF	Intel 486SX	20	MCA, 32-bit	8	8	one 1.44 MB	400 MB (SCSI)	4 MB	64 MB	XGA	optional	Tower	October 1990		
95 XP 486	8595-0H9	Intel 486SX	25	MCA, 32-bit	8	8	one 1.44 MB	160 MB (SCSI)	8 MB	64 MB	XGA	optional	Tower	October 1990		
95 XP 486	8595-0HF	Intel 486SX	25	MCA, 32-bit	8	8	one 1.44 MB	400 MB (SCSI)	8 MB	64 MB	XGA	optional	Tower	October 1990		
95 XP 486	8595-0J9	Intel 486	25	MCA, 32-bit	8	8	one 1.44 MB	160 MB (SCSI)	8 MB	64 MB	XGA	optional	Tower	October 1990		
95 XP 486	8595-0JD	Intel 486	25	MCA, 32-bit	8	8	one 1.44 MB	320 MB (SCSI)	8 MB	64 MB	XGA	optional	Tower	October 1990		
95 XP 486	8595-0JF	Intel 486	25	MCA, 32-bit	8	8	one 1.44 MB	400 MB (SCSI)	8 MB	64 MB	XGA	optional	Tower	October 1990		
95 XP 486	8595-0KD	Intel 486	33	MCA, 32-bit	8	8	one 1.44 MB	320 MB (SCSI)	8 MB	64 MB	XGA	optional	Tower	October 1990		
95 XP 486	8595-0KF	Intel 486	33	MCA, 32-bit	8	8	one 1.44 MB	400 MB (SCSI)	8 MB	64 MB	XGA	optional	Tower	October 1990		
95 XP 486	8595-0LF	Intel 486DX2	50	MCA, 32-bit	8	8	one 1.44 MB	400 MB (SCSI)	8 MB	64 MB	XGA	optional	Tower	October 1990		
95 XP 486	8595-0M6	Intel 486DX2	50	MCA, 32-bit	8	7	one 1.44 MB	104 MB (SCSI)	16 MB	64 MB	XGA	optional	Tower	October 1990		
95 XP 486	8595-0M9	Intel 486DX2	50	MCA, 32-bit	8	7	one 1.44 MB	160 MB (SCSI)	16 MB	64 MB	XGA	optional	Tower	October 1990		
95 XP 486	8595-0MA	Intel 486DX2	50	MCA, 32-bit	8	7	one 1.44 MB	208 MB/212 MB (SCSI)	16 MB	64 MB	XGA	optional	Tower	October 1990		
95 XP 486	8595-0MD	Intel 486DX2	50	MCA, 32-bit	8	7	one 1.44 MB	320 MB (SCSI)	16 MB	64 MB	XGA	optional	Tower	October 1990		
95 XP 486	8595-0MF	Intel 486DX2	50	MCA, 32-bit	8	7	one 1.44 MB	400 MB (SCSI)	16 MB	64 MB	XGA	optional	Tower	October 1990		
95 XP 486	8595-0MG	Intel 486DX2	50	MCA, 32-bit	8	7	one 1.44 MB	540 MB (SCSI)	16 MB	64 MB	XGA	optional	Tower	October 1990		
95 XP 486	8595-0MT	Intel 486DX2	50	MCA, 32-bit	8	7	one 1.44 MB	1 GB (SCSI)	16 MB	64 MB	XGA	optional	Tower	October 1990		
95 XP 486	9595-0L6	Intel 486DX2	50	MCA, 32-bit	8	8	one 1.44 MB	104 MB (SCSI)	8 MB	64 MB	XGA-2	optional	Tower	October 1992		
95 XP 486	9595-0L9	Intel 486DX2	50	MCA, 32-bit	8	8	one 1.44 MB	160 MB (SCSI)	8 MB	64 MB	XGA-2	optional	Tower	October 1992		
95 XP 486	9595-0LA	Intel 486DX2	50	MCA, 32-bit	8	8	one 1.44 MB	208 MB/212 MB (SCSI)	8 MB	64 MB	XGA-2	optional	Tower	October 1992		
95 XP 486	9595-0LD	Intel 486DX2	50	MCA, 32-bit	8	8	one 1.44 MB	320 MB (SCSI)	8 MB	64 MB	XGA-2	optional	Tower	October 1992		
95 XP 486	9595-0LF	Intel 486DX2	50	MCA, 32-bit	8	8	one 1.44 MB	400 MB (SCSI)	8 MB	64 MB	XGA-2	optional	Tower	October 1992		
95 XP 486	9595-0LG	Intel 486DX2	50	MCA, 32-bit	8	8	one 1.44 MB	540 MB (SCSI)	8 MB	64 MB	XGA-2	optional	Tower	October 1992		
95 XP 486	9595-0LT	Intel 486DX2	50	MCA, 32-bit	8	8	one 1.44 MB	1 GB (SCSI)	8 MB	64 MB	XGA-2	optional	Tower	October 1992		
E	9533	IBM 486SLC2	50	ISA, 16-bit	4 (PC Card)	1	one 1.44 MB	350 MB/none (IDE)	4 MB	16 MB	XGA-2	optional CRT/LCD	Small form factor desktop	July 1993		

=== PS/2 Server ===
IBM PS/2 Server models
Model	IBM P/N	Processor	Clock speed (MHz)	Bus	No. of slots	No. of drive bays	FDD	HDD	Stock RAM	Maximum RAM	Video adapter	Monitor	Form factor	Date introduced	Notes	Ref(s).
Server 85	9585-0X6	Intel 486SX	33	MCA, 32-bit	8	7	one 2.88 MB	104 MB (SCSI)	8 MB	64 MB	SVGA	optional	Tower	September 1992		
Server 85	9585-0X9	Intel 486SX	33	MCA, 32-bit	8	7	one 2.88 MB	160 MB (SCSI)	8 MB	64 MB	SVGA	optional	Tower	September 1992		
Server 85	9585-0XA	Intel 486SX	33	MCA, 32-bit	8	7	one 2.88 MB	208 MB/212 MB (SCSI)	8 MB	64 MB	SVGA	optional	Tower	September 1992		
Server 85	9585-0XD	Intel 486SX	33	MCA, 32-bit	8	7	one 2.88 MB	320 MB (SCSI)	8 MB	64 MB	SVGA	optional	Tower	September 1992		
Server 85	9585-0XF	Intel 486SX	33	MCA, 32-bit	8	7	one 2.88 MB	400 MB (SCSI)	8 MB	64 MB	SVGA	optional	Tower	September 1992		
Server 85	9585-0XG	Intel 486SX	33	MCA, 32-bit	8	7	one 2.88 MB	540 MB (SCSI)	8 MB	64 MB	SVGA	optional	Tower	September 1992		
Server 85	9585-0XT	Intel 486SX	33	MCA, 32-bit	8	7	one 2.88 MB	1 GB (SCSI)	8 MB	64 MB	SVGA	optional	Tower	September 1992		
Server 85	9585-0KG	Intel 486	33	MCA, 32-bit	8	7	one 2.88 MB	540 MB (SCSI)	8 MB	256 MB	SVGA	optional	Tower	November 1993		
Server 85	9585-0KT	Intel 486	33	MCA, 32-bit	8	7	one 2.88 MB	1 GB (SCSI)	8 MB	256 MB	SVGA	optional	Tower	November 1993		
Server 85	9585-0NG	Intel 486DX2	66	MCA, 32-bit	8	7	one 2.88 MB	540 MB (SCSI)	8 MB	256 MB	SVGA	optional	Tower	September 1993		
Server 85	9585-0NT	Intel 486DX2	66	MCA, 32-bit	8	7	one 2.88 MB	1 GB (SCSI)	8 MB	256 MB	SVGA	optional	Tower	September 1993		
Server 85	9585-4Vx	Intel 486SX	33	MCA, 32-bit	8	7	one 2.88 MB	400 MB (SCSI)	8 MB	64 MB	SVGA	optional	Tower	Unknown		
Server 85	9585-Z0x	Intel 486SX	33	MCA, 32-bit	8	7	one 2.88 MB	400 MB (SCSI)	8 MB	64 MB	SVGA	optional	Tower	June 1994		
Premium Server 85	9585-4Ux	Intel 486SX	33	MCA, 32-bit	8	7	one 2.88 MB	400 MB (SCSI)	8 MB	64 MB	SVGA	optional	Tower	May 1993		
Server 95	8595-0K6	Intel 486	33	MCA, 32-bit	8	8	one 1.44 MB	104 MB (SCSI)	8 MB	256 MB	SVGA	optional	Tower	Unknown		
Server 95	8595-0K9	Intel 486	33	MCA, 32-bit	8	8	one 1.44 MB	160 MB (SCSI)	8 MB	256 MB	SVGA	optional	Tower	Unknown		
Server 95	8595-0KA	Intel 486	33	MCA, 32-bit	8	8	one 1.44 MB	208 MB/212 MB (SCSI)	8 MB	256 MB	SVGA	optional	Tower	Unknown		
Server 95	8595-0KG	Intel 486	33	MCA, 32-bit	8	8	one 1.44 MB	540 MB (SCSI)	8 MB	256 MB	SVGA	optional	Tower	Unknown		
Server 95	8595-0KT	Intel 486	33	MCA, 32-bit	8	8	one 1.44 MB	1 GB (SCSI)	8 MB	256 MB	SVGA	optional	Tower	Unknown		
Server 95	8595-0L6	Intel 486	50	MCA, 32-bit	8	8	one 1.44 MB	104 MB (SCSI)	8 MB	256 MB	SVGA	optional	Tower	October 1992		
Server 95	8595-0L9	Intel 486	50	MCA, 32-bit	8	8	one 1.44 MB	160 MB (SCSI)	8 MB	256 MB	SVGA	optional	Tower	October 1992		
Server 95	8595-0LA	Intel 486	50	MCA, 32-bit	8	8	one 1.44 MB	208 MB/212 MB (SCSI)	8 MB	256 MB	SVGA	optional	Tower	October 1992		
Server 95	8595-0LD	Intel 486	50	MCA, 32-bit	8	8	one 1.44 MB	320 MB (SCSI)	8 MB	256 MB	SVGA	optional	Tower	October 1992		
Server 95	8595-0LG	Intel 486	50	MCA, 32-bit	8	8	one 1.44 MB	540 MB (SCSI)	8 MB	256 MB	SVGA	optional	Tower	October 1992		
Server 95	8595-0LT	Intel 486	50	MCA, 32-bit	8	8	one 1.44 MB	1 GB (SCSI)	8 MB	256 MB	SVGA	optional	Tower	October 1992		
Server 95	9595-0M6	Intel 486	50	MCA, 32-bit	8	8	one 1.44 MB	104 MB (SCSI)	16 MB	256 MB	SVGA	optional	Tower	October 1992		
Server 95	9595-0M9	Intel 486	50	MCA, 32-bit	8	8	one 1.44 MB	160 MB (SCSI)	16 MB	256 MB	SVGA	optional	Tower	October 1992		
Server 95	9595-0MA	Intel 486	50	MCA, 32-bit	8	8	one 1.44 MB	208 MB/212 MB (SCSI)	16 MB	256 MB	SVGA	optional	Tower	October 1992		
Server 95	9595-0MD	Intel 486	50	MCA, 32-bit	8	8	one 1.44 MB	320 MB (SCSI)	16 MB	256 MB	SVGA	optional	Tower	October 1992		
Server 95	9595-0MF	Intel 486	50	MCA, 32-bit	8	8	one 1.44 MB	400 MB (SCSI)	16 MB	256 MB	SVGA	optional	Tower	October 1992		
Server 95	9595-0MG	Intel 486	50	MCA, 32-bit	8	8	one 1.44 MB	540 MB (SCSI)	16 MB	256 MB	SVGA	optional	Tower	October 1992		
Server 95	9595-0MT	Intel 486	50	MCA, 32-bit	8	8	one 1.44 MB	1 GB (SCSI)	16 MB	256 MB	SVGA	optional	Tower	October 1992		
Server 95	9595-1NG	Intel 486DX2	66	MCA, 32-bit	8	7	one 1.44 MB	540 MB (SCSI)	16 MB	256 MB	SVGA	optional	Tower	October 1993		
Server 95	9595-1NT	Intel 486DX2	66	MCA, 32-bit	8	7	one 1.44 MB	1 GB (SCSI)	16 MB	256 MB	SVGA	optional	Tower	October 1993		
Server 95	9595-1NV	Intel 486DX2	66	MCA, 32-bit	8	7	one 1.44 MB	2 GB (SCSI)	16 MB	256 MB	SVGA	optional	Tower	1994		
Server 95	9595-0PT	Intel Pentium	60	MCA, 32-bit	8	7	one 1.44 MB	540 MB (SCSI)	16 MB	256 MB	SVGA	optional	Tower	September 1993		
Server 95	9595-0PV	Intel Pentium	60	MCA, 32-bit	8	7	one 1.44 MB	1 GB (SCSI)	16 MB	256 MB	SVGA	optional	Tower	September 1993		
Server 95	9595-0QG	Intel Pentium	66	MCA, 32-bit	8	7	one 1.44 MB	540 MB (SCSI)	16 MB	256 MB	SVGA	optional	Tower	September 1993		
Server 95	9595-0QT	Intel Pentium	66	MCA, 32-bit	8	7	one 1.44 MB	1 GB (SCSI)	16 MB	256 MB	SVGA	optional	Tower	February 1994		
Server 95	9595-0QV	Intel Pentium	66	MCA, 32-bit	8	7	one 1.44 MB	1 GB (SCSI)	16 MB	256 MB	SVGA	optional	Tower	September 1993		
Server 95 Array	9595-3NG	Intel 486DX2	66	MCA, 32-bit	8	9	one 1.44 MB	3×540 MB (SCSI)	8 MB	256 MB	SVGA	optional	Tower	November 1993		
Server 95 Array	9595-3NT	Intel 486DX2	66	MCA, 32-bit	8	9	one 1.44 MB	3×1 GB (SCSI)	8 MB	256 MB	SVGA	optional	Tower	November 1993		
Server 95 Array	9595-3NT	Intel 486DX2	66	MCA, 32-bit	8	9	one 1.44 MB	3×1 GB (SCSI)	8 MB	256 MB	SVGA	optional	Tower	November 1993		
Server 95 Array	9595-3PG	Intel Pentium	60	MCA, 32-bit	8	9	one 1.44 MB	3×540 MB (SCSI)	8 MB	256 MB	SVGA	optional	Tower	November 1993		
Server 95 Array	9595-3PT	Intel Pentium	60	MCA, 32-bit	8	9	one 1.44 MB	3×1 GB (SCSI)	8 MB	256 MB	SVGA	optional	Tower	November 1993		
Server 95 Array	9595-3QG	Intel Pentium	66	MCA, 32-bit	8	9	one 1.44 MB	3×540 MB (SCSI)	8 MB	256 MB	SVGA	optional	Tower	November 1993		
Server 95 Array	9595-3QT	Intel Pentium	66	MCA, 32-bit	8	9	one 1.44 MB	3×1 GB (SCSI)	8 MB	256 MB	SVGA	optional	Tower	November 1993		
Premium Server 95	9595-Z0x	Intel 486DX2; Intel Pentium	66	MCA, 32-bit	8	7	one 2.88 MB	1 GB (SCSI)	8 MB	256 MB	SVGA	optional	Tower	December 1994	Pre-installed with IBM LAN Server or Novell NetWare	
Server 295	8600-001	Intel 486	33	MCA, 32-bit, dual	12	10	one 1.44 MB	400 MB/1 GB (SCSI)	32 MB	128 MB	SVGA	optional	Tower	June 1992	Supports up to 28 GB of hot-swappable hard drive storage, RAID-5 compatible, dual processor optional, accepts only IBM 400 MB or 1 GB disks	
Server 295	8600-002	Intel 486	50	MCA, 32-bit, dual	12	10	one 1.44 MB	400 MB/1 GB (SCSI)	32 MB	128 MB	SVGA	optional	Tower	June 1992	Supports up to 28 GB of hot-swappable hard drive storage, RAID-5 compatible, dual processor optional, accepts only IBM 400 MB or 1 GB disks	
Server 195	8600-003	2×Intel 486	50	MCA, 32-bit, dual	12	10	one 1.44 MB	400 MB/1 GB (SCSI)	32 MB	128 MB	SVGA	optional	Tower	April 1993	Supports up to 28 GB of hard drive storage, RAID-5 compatible, dual processor standard, accepts only IBM 400 MB or 1 GB disks	

=== Portables ===
IBM PS/2 portable models
Model	IBM P/N	Processor	Clock speed (MHz)	Bus	No. of slots	No. of drive bays	FDD	HDD	Stock RAM	Maximum RAM	Video adapter	Monitor	Form factor	Date introduced	Notes	Ref(s).
P70	8573-031	Intel 386	16	MCA, 32-bit	2, 1-16bit 1- 32bit	0	one 1.44 MB	30 MB (ESDI)	2 MB	8 MB	VGA	Monochrome gas plasma	Portable	March 1990	Includes slot for optional i387 co-processor	
P70	8573-061	Intel 386	20	MCA, 32-bit	2 (one 16-bit, one 32-bit)	0	one 1.44 MB	60 MB (ESDI)	2 MB	8 MB	VGA	Monochrome gas plasma	Portable	May 1989	Includes slot for optional i387 co-processor	
P70	8573-121	Intel 386	20	MCA, 32-bit	2 (one 16-bit, one 32-bit)	0	one 1.44 MB	120 MB (ESDI)	2 MB	8 MB	VGA	Monochrome gas plasma	Portable	May 1989	Includes slot for optional i387 co-processor	
P75	8573-161	Intel 486	33	MCA, 32-bit	4 (two 16-bit, two 32-bit)	0	one 1.44 MB	160 MB (SCSI)	4 MB	16 MB	VGA	Monochrome gas plasma	Portable	November 1990	SCSI controller built into planar	
P75	8573-401	Intel 486	33	MCA, 32-bit	4 (two 16-bit, two 32-bit)	0	one 1.44 MB	400 MB (SCSI)	4 MB	16 MB	VGA	Monochrome gas plasma	Portable	November 1990	SCSI controller built into planar	
L40 SX	8543-A44	Intel 386SX	20	ISA, 16-bit	0 (1 with AT bus expansion port)	0	one 1.44	60 MB (IDE)	2 MB	18 MB	VGA	Monochrome LCD	Laptop	March 1991		
N51SX	8551-033	Intel 386SX	16	Proprietary	2 (PC Card)	Unknown	one 1.44	40 MB (IDE)	2 MB	10 MB	VGA	Monochrome LCD	Notebook	Unknown		
N51SLC	8551-025	IBM 386SLC	16	Proprietary	2 (PC Card)	Unknown	one 1.44	80 MB (IDE)	2 MB	10 MB	VGA	Monochrome LCD	Notebook	Unknown		
N33SX	8533-A33	Intel 386SX	16	Proprietary	2 (PC Card)	Unknown	one 1.44	40 MB (IDE)	Unknown	Unknown	Unknown	Monochrome LCD	Notebook	Unknown		
N33SX	8533-A35	Intel 386SX	16	Proprietary	2 (PC Card)	Unknown	one 1.44	80 MB (IDE)	Unknown	Unknown	Unknown	Monochrome LCD	Notebook	Unknown		
CL57 SX	8554-045	IBM 386SLC	16	Proprietary	2 (PC Card)	Unknown	one 1.44	80 MB (IDE)	2 MB	16 MB	VGA	Color TFT	Laptop	Unknown		

=== Related systems ===
IBM PS/2-related systems
Name	IBM P/N	Processor	Clock speed (MHz)	Bus	No. of slots	No. of drive bays	FDD	HDD	Stock RAM	Maximum RAM	Video adapter	Monitor	Form factor	Date introduced	Notes	Ref(s).
Academic System	6152-022	Intel 80286; ROMP 032	10 (286)	MCA, 16-bit	8	4	one 1.44	20 MB (ST-506)	2 MB	8 MB	VGA	optional	Tower	February 1988	ROMP processor on daughter card, cannot work in parallel with 286	
Academic System	6152-024	Intel 80286; ROMP 032	10 (286)	MCA, 16-bit	8	4	one 1.44	20 MB (ST-506)	4 MB	8 MB	VGA	optional	Tower	February 1988	ROMP processor on daughter card, cannot work in parallel with 286	
Academic System	6152-044	Intel 80286; ROMP 032	10 (286)	MCA, 16-bit	8	4	one 1.44	44 MB (ST-506)	4 MB	8 MB	VGA	optional	Tower	February 1988	ROMP processor on daughter card, cannot work in parallel with 286	
Academic System	6152-048	Intel 80286; ROMP 032	10 (286)	MCA, 16-bit	8	4	one 1.44	44 MB (ST-506)	8 MB	8 MB	VGA	optional	Tower	February 1988	ROMP processor on daughter card, cannot work in parallel with 286	
Academic System	6152-074	Intel 80286; ROMP 032	10 (286)	MCA, 16-bit	8	4	one 1.44	70 MB (ESDI)	4 MB	8 MB	VGA	optional	Tower	February 1988	ROMP processor on daughter card, cannot work in parallel with 286	
Academic System	6152-078	Intel 80286; ROMP 032	10 (286)	MCA, 16-bit	8	4	one 1.44	70 MB (ESDI)	8 MB	8 MB	VGA	optional	Tower	February 1988	ROMP processor on daughter card, cannot work in parallel with 286	
Clinical Workstation	7690	Intel 8086	8 (0 w)	ISA, 8-bit	4	0	one 1.44 MB	none	640 KB	8 MB	MCGA	Monochrome LCD	Mobile workstation	September 1989	Purpose-built mobile workstation using the Model 25 system board and Model 30 firmware for the healthcare sector; pairs with the IBM 7496 Executive Workstation	
EduQuest Thirty	9603	IBM 386SLC	25	ISA, 16-bit	4	2	one 1.44 MB	30 MB (IDE)	1–4 MB	20 MB	SVGA	14-in. color	All-in-one	March 1993	Model 25 adapted specifically for educational institutions, optional sound card, late models without IBM logo on badge	
EduQuest Forty	9604	Intel 486SX	25	ISA, 16-bit	4	2	one 1.44 MB	30 MB (IDE)	4 MB	20 MB	SVGA	14-in. color	All-in-one	March 1993	Model 25 adapted specifically for educational institutions, optional sound card, late models without IBM logo on badge	
EduQuest Fifty	9605	Intel 486SX	25	ISA, 16-bit	4	2	one 1.44 MB	30 MB (IDE)	4 MB	20 MB	SVGA	14-in. color	All-in-one	March 1993	Model 25 adapted specifically for educational institutions, optional sound card, late models without IBM logo on badge	
EduQuest Thirty-cs	9606	Cyrix Cx486SLC2	25/50	ISA, 16-bit	4	2	one 1.44 MB	Unknown	Unknown	Unknown	SVGA	14-in. color	All-in-one	1994	Model 25 adapted specifically for educational institutions, optional sound card	
EduQuest Fifty-cs	9608	Intel 486DX2	33	ISA, 16-bit	4	2	one 1.44 MB	Unknown	Unknown	Unknown	SVGA	14-in. color	All-in-one	1994	Model 25 adapted specifically for educational institutions, optional sound card	
EduQuest Thirty-five	9613	Cyrix Cx486SLC2	25/50	ISA, 16-bit	4	2	one 1.44 MB	133 MB/256 MB/342 MB (IDE)	4 MB	Unknown	SVGA	14-in. color	All-in-one	September 1994	Model 25 adapted specifically for educational institutions, optional sound card, late models without IBM logo on badge	
EduQuest Fifty-five	9615	Intel 486	33–100	ISA, 16-bit	4	2	one 1.44 MB	170 MB/360 MB/540 MB (IDE)	4 MB	64 MB	SVGA	14-in. color	All-in-one	September 1994	Model 25 adapted specifically for educational institutions, optional sound card, six processor options offered	
EduQuest Forty-five	9614	Intel 486DX2	50 or 66	ISA, 16-bit	4	2	one 1.44 MB	Unknown	4 MB	Unknown	SVGA	14-in. color	All-in-one	September 1995	Model 25 adapted specifically for educational institutions, optional sound card	
Executive Workstation	7496	Intel 8086	8 (0 w)	ISA, 8-bit	3	0	one 720 KB	none	640 KB	640 KB	MCGA	Monochrome	All-in-one	September 1989	Purpose-built all-in-one computer using the Model 30 system board for the healthcare sector; pairs with the IBM 7690 Clinical Workstation (image 1, 2)	
GE Fanuc Workmaster II	7186	Intel 386	16	MCA, 32-bit	0	0	one 1.44 MB	30 MB (ESDI)	2 MB	8 MB	VGA	Monochrome gas plasma	Portable	March 1990	General Electric Fanuc-branded ruggedized industrial PS/2 P70 in black plastic case	
Industrial Computer	7552-040	Intel 80286	10	ISA, 16-bit MCA, 16-bit (undocumented)	8 (modules, 7 fillable)	3 (as modules)	none	none	512 KB	3 MB	EGA	optional	Benchtop or rack mount	October 1986	Also known as "Gearbox", rack-mountable ruggedized modular industrial computer, hybrid MCA and ISA with compromised ISA signal lines—notable for introducing the (16-bit) Micro Channel architecture half a year before the announcement of the PS/2 line in April 1987	
Industrial Computer	7552-140	Intel 80286	10	ISA, 16-bit MCA, 16-bit (undocumented)	8 (modules, 7 fillable)	3 (as modules)	one 1.44 MB (as a module)	20 MB (as a module, 40 MB as two identical modules; ST-506)	512 KB	3 MB	VGA	optional	Benchtop or rack mount	October 1986	Also known as "Gearbox", rack-mountable ruggedized modular industrial computer, hybrid MCA and ISA with compromised ISA signal lines—notable for introducing the (16-bit) Micro Channel architecture half a year before the announcement of the PS/2 line in April 1987	
Industrial Computer	7541	Intel 80286	10	MCA, 16-bit	3	3	one 1.44 MB	30 MB (ESDI)	1 MB	8 MB (on planar); 16 MB (with expansion card)	VGA	optional	Benchtop	March 1989	Desktop ruggedized industrial PS/2	
Industrial Computer	7542	Intel 80286	10	MCA, 16-bit	4	3	one 1.44 MB	30 MB (ESDI)	1 MB	8 MB (on planar); 16 MB (with expansion card)	VGA	optional	Rack mount	March 1989	Rack-mounted ruggedized industrial PS/2	
Industrial Computer	7561	Intel 386	20	MCA, 32-bit	3	4	one 1.44 MB	60 MB (ESDI)	2 MB	8 MB (on planar); 16 MB (with expansion card)	VGA	optional	Benchtop	March 1989	Desktop ruggedized industrial PS/2	
Industrial Computer	7562	Intel 386	20	MCA, 32-bit	4	4	one 1.44 MB	60 MB (ESDI)	2 MB	8 MB (on planar); 16 MB (with expansion card)	VGA	optional	Rack mount	March 1989	Rack-mounted ruggedized industrial PS/2	
Industrial Computer	7546	Intel 386SX	20	MCA, 16-bit	5	4	one 2.88 MB	320/400 MB (SCSI)	4 MB	16 MB	VGA	optional	Benchtop or rack mount	September 1991	Rack-mountable desktop ruggedized industrial PS/2	
Industrial Computer	7568-040	Intel 386	25	MCA, 32-bit ISA, 16-bit (with adapter interposer)	8 (modules, 7 fillable)	3 (as modules)	one 1.44 MB (as a module)	none	4 MB	8 MB (on planar); 16 MB (with expansion card)	VGA	optional	Benchtop or rack mount	October 1989	Also known as "Gearbox 800", rack-mountable ruggedized modular industrial PS/2	
Industrial Computer	7568-150	Intel 386	25	MCA, 32-bit ISA, 16-bit (with adapter interposer)	8 (modules, 6 fillable)	3 (as modules)	one 1.44 MB (as a module)	120 MB (as a module, 240 MB as two identical modules; ESDI)	8 MB	8 MB (on planar); 16 MB (with expansion card)	VGA	optional	Benchtop or rack mount	October 1989	Also known as "Gearbox 800", rack-mountable ruggedized modular industrial PS/2	
Industrial Computer	7568-C40	Intel 486	25	MCA, 32-bit ISA, 16-bit (with adapter interposer)	8 (modules, 7 fillable)	3 (as modules)	one 1.44 MB (as a module)	optional	8 MB	8 MB (on planar); 16 MB (with expansion card)	VGA	optional	Benchtop or rack mount	September 1991	Also known as "Gearbox 800", rack-mountable ruggedized modular industrial PS/2	
Industrial Computer	7568-D40	Intel 486DX2	50	MCA, 32-bit ISA, 16-bit (with adapter interposer)	8 (modules, 7 fillable)	3 (as modules)	one 1.44 MB (as a module)	optional	8 MB	8 MB (on planar); 16 MB (with expansion card)	VGA	optional	Benchtop or rack mount	September 1991	Also known as "Gearbox 800", rack-mountable ruggedized modular industrial PS/2	
Personal Typing System	6901-001	Intel 8086	8 (0 w)	ISA, 8-bit	0	2	one 720 KB (two optional)	none (20 MB optional with single-floppy model; ST-506)	640 KB	640 KB	MCGA	12-in. monochrome	Desktop	July 1987	Slightly modified application-specific Model 30 with word processing software, networking expansion card, and Wheelwriter	
Personal Typing System	6901-002	Intel 8086	8 (0 w)	ISA, 8-bit	0	2	one 720 KB (two optional)	none (20 MB optional with single-floppy model; ST-506)	640 KB	640 KB	MCGA	12-in. monochrome	Desktop	July 1987	Slightly modified application-specific Model 30 with word processing software, networking expansion card, and Quietwriter	
Personal Typing System	6901-003	Intel 8086	8 (0 w)	ISA, 8-bit	0	2	one 720 KB (two optional)	none (20 MB optional with single-floppy model; ST-506)	640 KB	640 KB	MCGA	12-in. color	Desktop	July 1987	Slightly modified application-specific Model 30 with word processing software, networking expansion card, and Wheelwriter	
Personal Typing System	6901-004	Intel 8086	8 (0 w)	ISA, 8-bit	0	2	one 720 KB (two optional)	none (20 MB optional with single-floppy model; ST-506)	640 KB	640 KB	MCGA	12-in. color	Desktop	July 1987	Slightly modified application-specific Model 30 with word processing software, networking expansion card, and Quietwriter	
Personal Typing System	6901-005	Intel 8086	8 (0 w)	ISA, 8-bit	0	2	one 720 KB (two optional)	none (20 MB optional with single-floppy model; ST-506)	640 KB	640 KB	MCGA	12-in. monochrome	Desktop	July 1987	Slightly modified application-specific Model 30 with word processing software and networking expansion card	
Personal Typing System	6901-006	Intel 8086	8 (0 w)	ISA, 8-bit	0	2	one 720 KB (two optional)	none (20 MB optional with single-floppy model; ST-506)	640 KB	640 KB	MCGA	12-in. color	Desktop	July 1987	Slightly modified application-specific Model 30 with word processing software and networking expansion card	
Personal Typing System/2	6907	Intel 8086	8 (0 w)	ISA, 8-bit	2	2	one 1.44 MB (two optional)	none (20 MB optional with single-floppy model; ST-506)	640 KB	640 KB	MCGA	optional	Desktop	July 1989	Slightly modified application-specific Model 30 with word processing software and networking expansion card, Wheelwriter optional	
Personal Typing System/2 286	6908	Intel 80286	10 (1 w)	ISA, 16-bit	2	2	one 1.44 MB (two optional)	none (20/30 MB optional with single-floppy model; ST-506/ESDI)	1 MB	1 MB	VGA	optional	Desktop	July 1989	Slightly modified application-specific Model 30 286 with word processing software and networking expansion card, Wheelwriter optional	

== See also ==
- List of third-party Micro Channel computers
- List of IBM PS/55 models
- List of IBM Personal Computer models
