= EduQuest =

Subsidiary of IBM; educational computer company

- Formerly: IBM Educational Systems (1982–1992); IBM EduQuest (1992–1994)
- Company type: Division
- Founded: January 1992; 34 years ago in Atlanta, Georgia
- Founder: James Elton Dezell Jr.
- Defunct: 1995; 31 years ago
- Fate: Restructured
- Successor: IBM K–12 Education
- Products: Computer systems; Software
- Parent: International Business Machines Corporation (IBM)

IBM EduQuest, later shortened to EduQuest, was a subsidiary of American multinational technology corporation IBM that catered to the elementary and secondary educational market. A spin-off of the company's Educational Systems division spearheaded by James Elton Dezell Jr. (1933–2000), EduQuest developed software and hardware for schools. Most prominent was their line of all-in-one personal computers, whose form factor was based on IBM's PS/2 Model 25.

== History ==
The roots of EduQuest began with a division within IBM called Educational Systems, formed in 1982 by James Elton Dezell Jr. (1933–2000), an IBM executive and former teacher. IBM spun it off as EduQuest in 1992 and named Dezell as president. Its initial personnel comprised 1,000 sales and support employees, including 400 at its headquarters in Atlanta, Georgia. From 1992 to 1994, EduQuest operated independently of IBM, the latter describing EduQuest as a "company within a company" in promotional material. IBM reserved their role as a holding company, renting real estate and equipment to EduQuest. In January 1994, EduQuest was consolidated with IBM's two other educational divisions, Academic Information Systems (or ACIS; geared toward higher education) and Skill Dynamics (computer and management training products used within IBM and marketed to other corporations). The post-consolidation subsidiary was named IBM Education Businesses, with the three divisions including EduQuest still operating in their original capacities. EduQuest retained close ties with the IBM Personal Computer Company, another spin-off of IBM formed in August 1992 that assumed responsibility of developing and selling IBM's desktop and mobile computers, such as the ThinkPad and PS/ValuePoint.

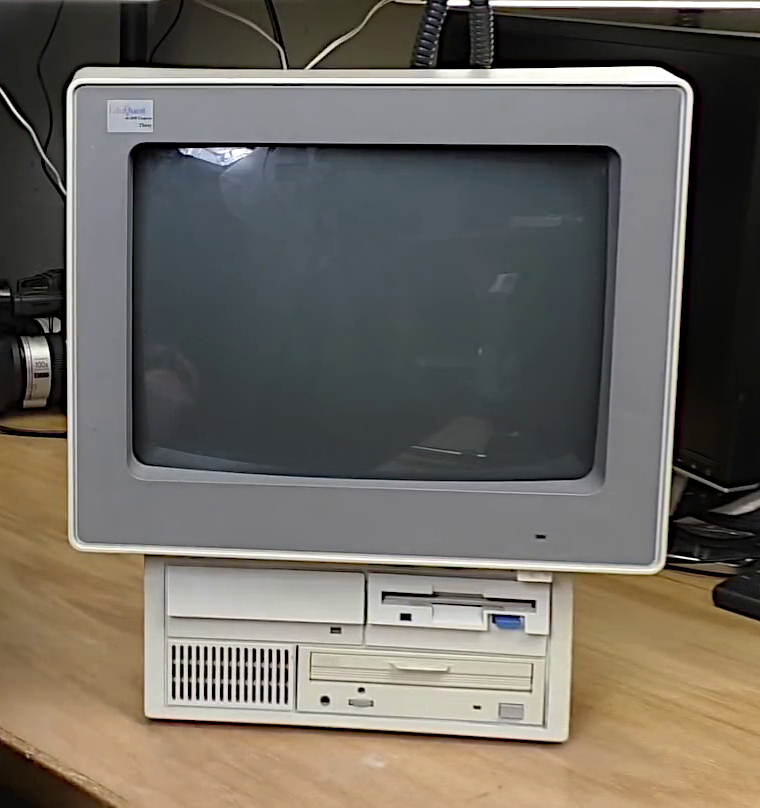
Front view of an EduQuest Model Thirty with CD-ROM drive

EduQuest sold both hardware and software to schools. The subsidiary directly competed with Apple Computer, who had long cornered the educational computer market. Most of EduQuest's software was interactive multimedia material and edutainment games co-developed by other software developers, such as Alternate Solutions.

EduQuest's first computer system was the PS/2 Model 25 SX, an update to the Model 25 all-in-one offering within IBM's PS/2 line of personal computers that upgraded the processor to an i386SX. The PS/2 Model 25 SX was developed shortly before the formation of EduQuest, in IBM's Boca Raton facility, led by José García. EduQuest's later computer systems were still based on the Model 25 form factor but broke away from the PS/2 branding. In 1993, they introduced the Model Thirty, Model Forty, and Model Fifty. School district technology departments could order these models with adjustments to the hardware such as the networking capability (Token Ring, Ethernet or none at all); the amount of RAM; the presence of sound card; the size of the hard disk drive; and whether to install the optional CD-ROM drive. EduQuest developed the systems to withstand the rigors of elementary and secondary school use through physically attaching the mouse to the system chassis and making the mouse unable to be tampered with to remove the roller ball; covering the floppy drive with a dust shield to prevent chalk dust and dirt from gumming up the internals; and a special optional keyboard with a built-in trackball. In May 1994, EduQuest introduced the Model Thirty-five and Model Fifty-Five, featuring upgraded processors. The Easton Area School District purchased 1,418 of these Models in November 1994.

EduQuest effectively went defunct in 1995 when it changed its name to IBM K–12 Education, moved its headquarters to Phoenix, Arizona, and stopped selling hardware. It continued selling software targeted at students, teachers, and district administration.

== Computers ==
EduQuest computers
Name	IBM P/N	Processor	Clock speed (MHz)	Bus	L2 cache (KB)	No. of slots	No. of drive bays	FDD	HDD	Stock memory	Monitor	Form factor	Date introduced	Notes	Ref(s).
25 SX	8525-K00	Intel 80386SX	20	ISA, 16-bit	0	3	2	one 1.44 MB		1 MB	12-in. color	All-in-one	April 1992		
25 SX	8525-K01	Intel 80386SX	20	ISA, 16-bit	0	3	2	one 1.44 MB		1 MB	12-in. color	All-in-one	April 1992	Ethernet	
25 SX	8525-L02	Intel 80386SX	20	ISA, 16-bit	0	3	2	one 1.44 MB		1 MB	12-in. color	All-in-one	April 1992	Token Ring	
EduQuest Thirty	9603	IBM 386SLC	25	ISA, 16-bit	0	4	2	one 1.44 MB	30 MB	1–4 MB	14-in. color	All-in-one	March 1993	Model 25 adapted specifically for educational institutions, optional sound card, late models without IBM logo on badge	
EduQuest Forty	9604	Intel 80486SX	25	ISA, 16-bit	0	4	2	one 1.44 MB	30 MB	4 MB	14-in. color	All-in-one	March 1993	Model 25 adapted specifically for educational institutions, optional sound card, late models without IBM logo on badge	
EduQuest Fifty	9605	Intel 80486SX	25	ISA, 16-bit	0	4	2	one 1.44 MB	30 MB	4 MB	14-in. color	All-in-one	March 1993	Model 25 adapted specifically for educational institutions, optional sound card, late models without IBM logo on badge	
EduQuest Thirty-cs	9606	Cyrix Cx486SLC2	25/50	ISA, 16-bit	0	4	2	one 1.44 MB	?	?	14-in. color	All-in-one	1994	Model 25 adapted specifically for educational institutions, optional sound card	
EduQuest Fifty-cs	9608	Intel 80486DX2	33	ISA, 16-bit	0	4	2	one 1.44 MB	?	?	14-in. color	All-in-one	1994	Model 25 adapted specifically for educational institutions, optional sound card	
EduQuest Thirty-five	9613	Cyrix Cx486SLC2	25/50	ISA, 16-bit	0	4	2	one 1.44 MB	133 MB/256 MB/342 MB	4 MB	14-in. color	All-in-one	September 1994	Model 25 adapted specifically for educational institutions, optional sound card, late models without IBM logo on badge	
EduQuest Fifty-five	9615	Intel 80486	33–100	ISA, 16-bit	0	4	2	one 1.44 MB	170 MB/360 MB/540 MB	4 MB	14-in. color	All-in-one	September 1994	Model 25 adapted specifically for educational institutions, optional sound card, six processor options offered	
EduQuest Forty-five	9614	Intel 80486DX2	50 or 66	ISA, 16-bit	0	4	2	one 1.44 MB	?	4 MB	14-in. color	All-in-one	September 1995	Model 25 adapted specifically for educational institutions, optional sound card	

== Timeline ==
Timeline of the IBM Personal Computer

Asterisk (*) denotes a model released in Japan only

== See also ==
- EduQuest SchoolView
