= IBM PS/2 E =

1993 IBM desktop computer

PS/2 E
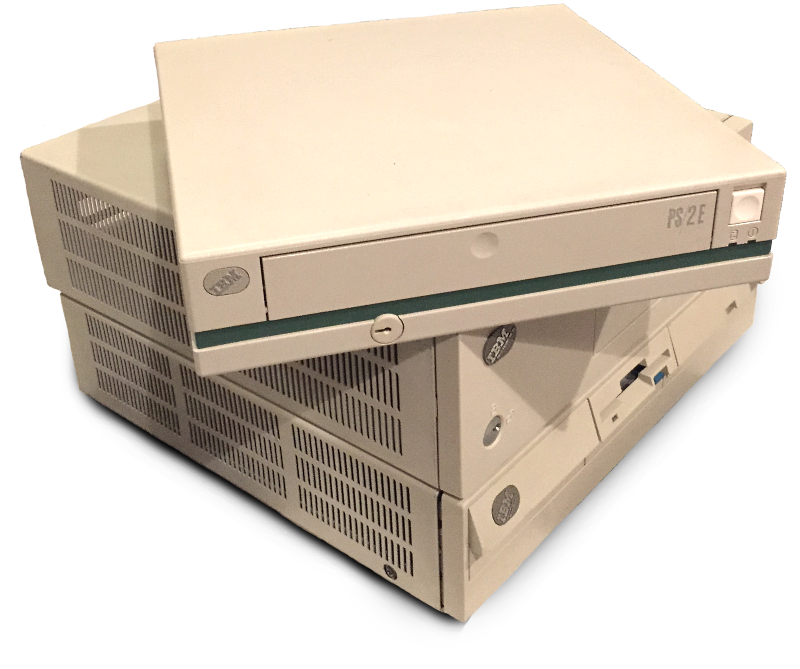
- The IBM PS/2 E on top of a Model 56 and Model 30 286.
- Developer: International Business Machines Corporation (IBM)
- Manufacturer: IBM
- Product family: Personal System/2
- Type: Personal computer
- Released: July 29, 1993; 32 years ago
- Units sold: Around 25,000
- Media: 1.44 MB 3½-inch floppy disks
- Operating system: IBM DOS 5.02 or 6.1, Windows 3.1, Windows 95, OS/2
- CPU: 50 MHz IBM 486SLC2
- Memory: 4–16 MB
- Storage: 120–340 MB hard drive
- Input: Track Point II Keyboard, mouse (optional), touch screen
- Power: 24 watt 90-265 VAC
- Dimensions: 304.8 × 304.8 × 69.6 mm
- Weight: 4.3–4.66 kg
- Related: List of IBM PS/2 models

The PS/2 E or Energy (IBM 9533) is a member of the IBM Personal System/2 family of personal computers (PCs). It was the first Energy Star-compliant PC, consuming very little power relative to other contemporary PCs, and made extensive use of recycled materials in its enclosure.

== Specifications ==
The PS/2 E featured an IBM 486SLC2 microprocessor with a 16 KB L1 cache that ran at 50 MHz on a 25 MHz 16-bit system bus (the processor clock was double that of the system bus) instead of the 32-bit bus of a full 386 or 486 processor. The processor's performance was dependent on the L1 cache containing the required instructions and data; there was no external L2 cache on the motherboard like on some other 486-based computers.

It featured an ISA bus for input/output, which accepted a single ISA option adapter with the use of a riser card. Depending on the sub-model number, it came supplied with either a special option adapter for four PC card PCMCIA slots, or a network interface card for Ethernet or Token Ring networks for use as a diskless workstation. Additional options included several PCMCIA cards, a color LCD screen, and a color LCD touch-screen with a special version of OS/2.

The PC borrowed some components from IBM's ThinkPad laptops: including the 1.44 MB floppy disk drive and the hard disk drive. Its enclosure was composed of recycled plastics, and was designed to be easily recycled at the end of its service life. The power supply unit maximum power consumption was 24 watts, and was completely passively cooled, and lacked a fan for that reason.

== Design ==
The PS/2 E featured a full-sized internal PC speaker, two SIMM sockets, and an extended bank of memory soldered directly to the motherboard. It featured 1 MB of video memory for the onboard XGA-2 graphics adapter, which was attached to the ISA bus instead of the usual MCA bus. Like all Personal System/2 computers, if a change in hardware is performed, the configuration must be updated with the use of the reference diskette (for example changing the memory size).

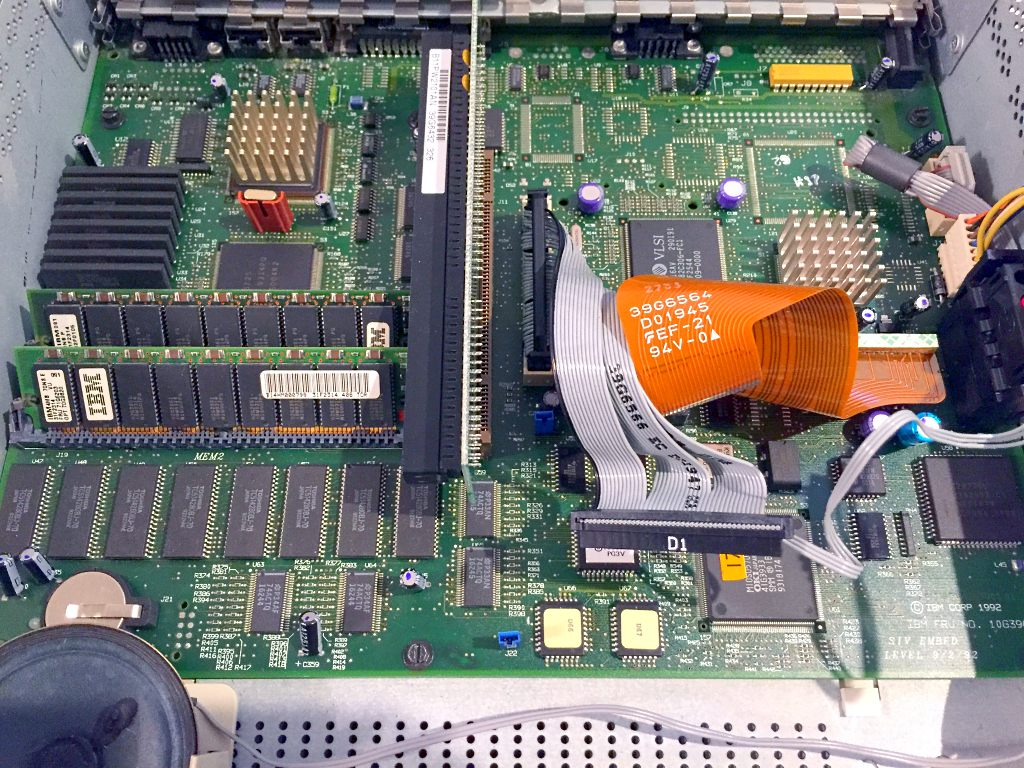
The PS/2 E motherboard

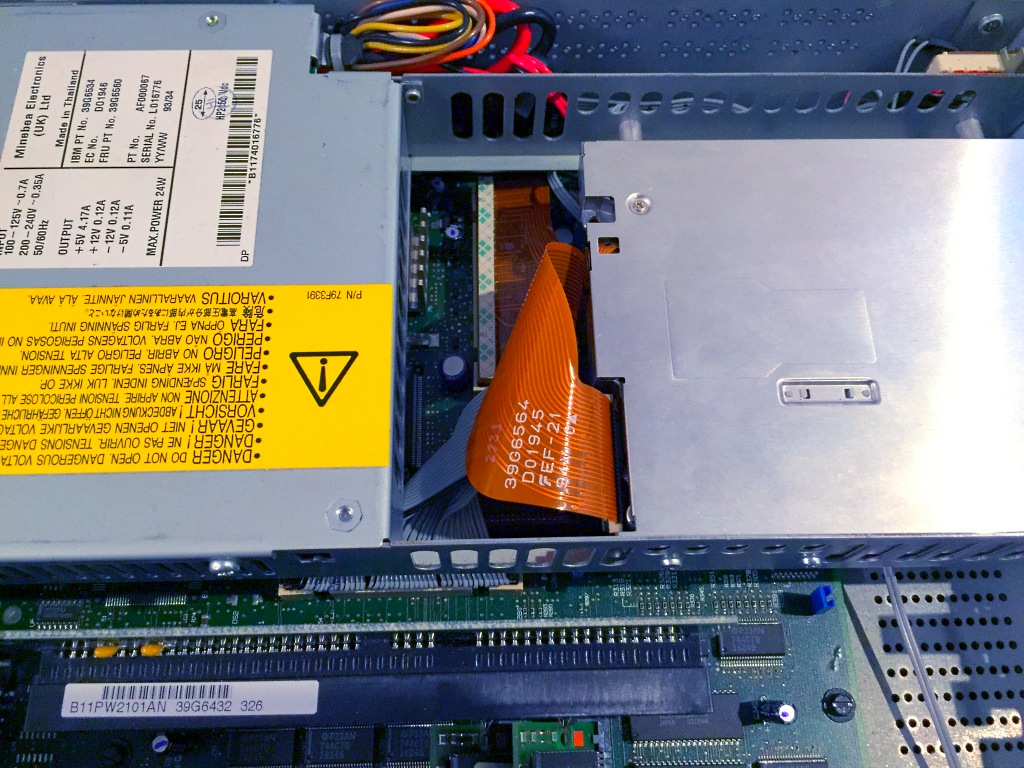
The power supply and floppy drive on the internal rail

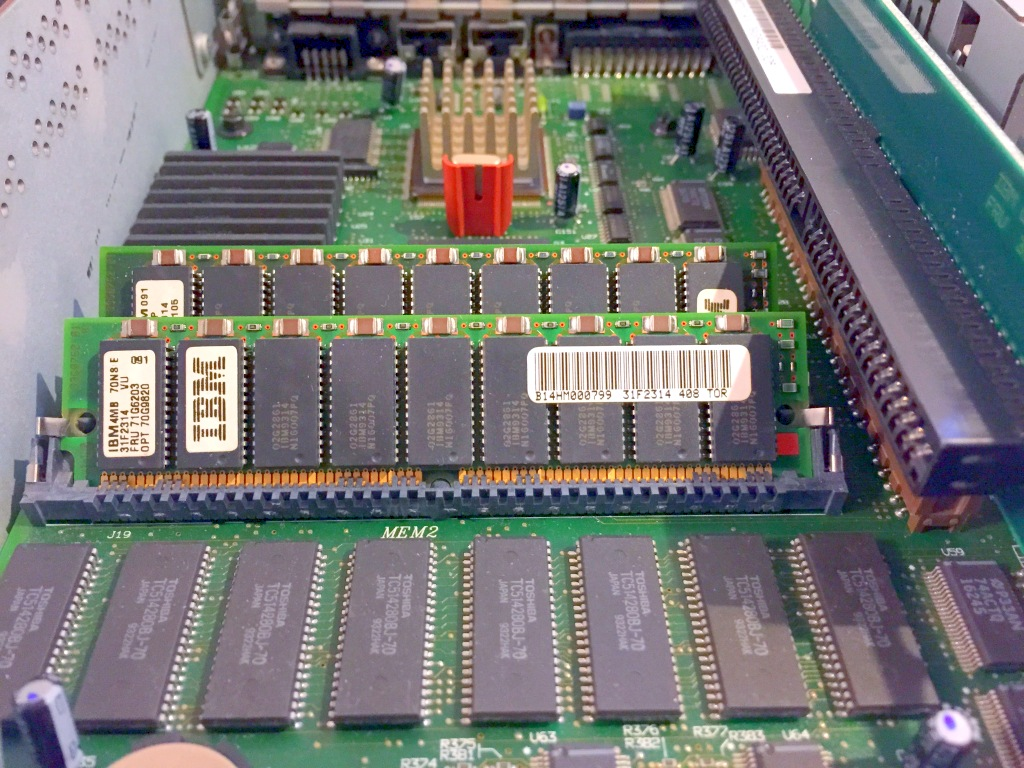
A closeup of the internal memory bank and two SIMMs
