= IBM PS/2 Model 55 SX =

1989 IBM desktop computer

Personal System/2 Model 55 SX

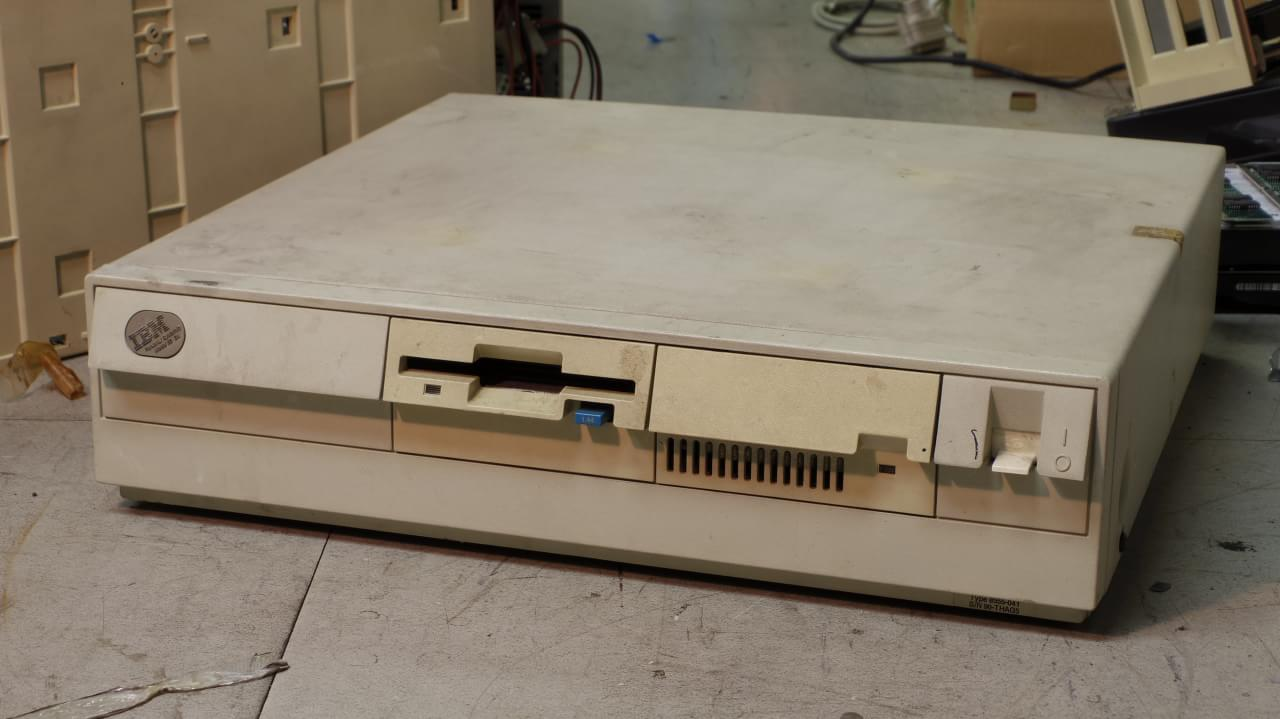
- A PS/2 Model 55 SX
- Developer: International Business Machines Corporation (IBM)
- Manufacturer: IBM
- Product family: Personal System/2
- Type: Personal computer
- Released: May 9, 1989; 37 years ago (Model 55 SX); October 9, 1990 (Model 55 SL)
- Lifespan: 1989–1992
- Discontinued: May 1992
- Units sold: Over 1 million
- Media: 1.44 MB 3.5-in floppy disks (Model 55 SX); None (Model 55 SL)
- CPU: Intel 386SX at 16 MHz
- Storage: 30–80 MB hard drive (Model 55 SX); None (Model 55 SL)
- Graphics: Video Graphics Array
- Power: 120/240 VAC ～
- Successor: PS/2 Model 57; PS/2 Model 56; PS/2 Model 53 486SLC2
- Related: List of IBM PS/2 models

The Personal System/2 Model 55 SX is a midrange desktop computer in IBM's Personal System/2 (PS/2) family of personal computers. First released in May 1989, the Model 55 SX features an Intel 386SX processor running at a clock speed of 16 MHz. In October 1990, IBM introduced a diskless workstation version of the Model 55 SX, called the Personal System/2 Model 55 LS. The Model 55 SX was the best-ever selling computer in the PS/2 range, accounting for 23 percent of IBM's PC sales within four months of its introduction. By 1991, the PS/2 Model 55 SX was the best-selling x86-based PC in the world.

IBM succeeded the Model 55 SX with the Personal System/2 Model 57 in 1991, the Personal System/2 Model 56 in 1992, and the Personal System/2 Model 53 SLC2 subfamilies in 1993, with IBM discontinuing the Model 55 SX in mid-1992.

== Development and release ==
IBM announced the PS/2 Model 55 SX on May 9, 1989, alongside the portable PS/2 Model P70. The Model 55 SX was IBM's first personal computer to use the 386SX processor by Intel, released almost a year earlier in June 1988. The 386SX was a cost-reduced version of the 32-bit 386 processor, also by Intel. Internally, the 386SX supports 32-bit operations, but its data bus could only access RAM 16 bits at a time, leading to a performance reduction of around 30 percent compared to a 386 processor with the same clock speed. The PS/2 Model 55 SX sports a horizontal desktop case exactly identical to that of the PS/2 Model 30, released earlier in 1987.

The Model 55 SX, along with the Model P70, were the first new models of PS/2 to be assembled from the beginning at IBM's factory in Raleigh, North Carolina. Previously, models of PS/2 were manufactured at IBM's facility in Boca Raton, Florida, before the company moved personal computer production to Raleigh in 1989. Prototyping of the computers were still performed in Boca Raton, however. Owing to initial runs of the 55 SX's motherboard failing to meet IBM's quality-control standards, announcement of the computer was delayed by over a month, according to InfoWorld, pending motherboard design revisions.

== Specifications ==
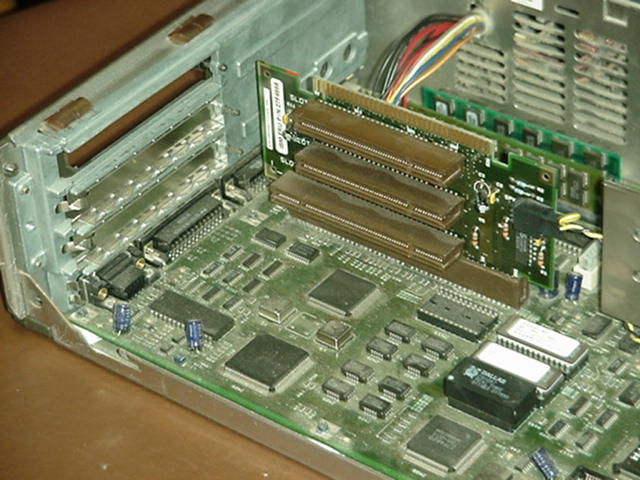
Internal view of the Model 55 SX, detailing the three 16-bit Micro Channel expansion slots

=== Model 55 SX ===
All models of the Model 55 SX features a 386SX processor clocked at 16 MHz and have 2 MB of RAM stock and on-board VGA graphics. As a consequence of the processor's 16-bit data path, the Model 55 SX sports only three 16-bit Micro Channel expansion slots, whereas other true 32-bit offerings in the PS/2 line carried at least some 32-bit slots. One of the Model 55 SX's 16-bit slots features an extension for specific MCA graphics adapters such as the 8514/A. The initial two models in the PS/2 Model 55 SX range were the Model 55 SX-031, featuring a 30-MB hard disk drive, and the Model 55 SX-061, featuring a 60-MB hard drive. In June 1991, IBM introduced two more models of Model 55 SX, with 40- and 80-MB drives (the Model 55 SX-041 and Model 55 SX-081, respectively). All hard drives were of Enhanced Small Disk Interface (ESDI) specification, which IBM used extensively in the PS/2 range and which was faster than the ST-506 interface of older IBM PCs. The computer has two 3.5-inch drive bays, both occupied as stock by the included hard drives and the 3.5-inch floppy disk drives. Users had to make use of external drives if they wanted more storage options, with the associated controllers taking up one of the three Micro Channel slots.

=== Model 55 LS ===
On October 9, 1990, IBM introduced the Model 55 LS (LAN Station), which were diskless-workstation versions of the Model 55 SX featuring no installed drives—not even a floppy drive. Instead, the computers came preinstalled with either an Ethernet adapter or a Token Ring adapter (IBM's own networking standard), with the machines booting their operating system from a LAN server and having all applications and data remotely served and saved. IBM had been offering the Model 55 LS as a special bid version of the Model 55 SX for customers who specifically requested since its release in 1989, but the Model 55 LS was IBM's first computer specifically branded as a diskless workstation.

== Sales ==
Sales of the Model 55 SX ramped up significantly over the summer of 1989, with the machine representing 23 percent of all IBM personal computers sold by September 1989, up from 4 percent only two months earlier. This share of IBM's PC sales remained steady into the next year, the Model 55 SX representing 22 percent of IBM's PC sales in June 1990. For the majority of 1990, it was the best-selling personal computer in the United States. By 1991, it was the best selling x86-based PC globally. It was IBM's best-selling PS/2 by a significant margin, with the company selling 25,000 units of the computer in August 1990 alone. The heretofore best-selling PS/2 Model 50 Z, meanwhile, sold only 18,000 in a single month (October 1988). This represented a reversal of fortunes for the PS/2 line, which had underperformed as a whole compared to IBM's earlier PC line. The Model 55 SX proved so popular that IBM reported parts shortages in April 1990.

Apple Computer eventually overtook IBM for the number one spot in U.S. computer sales with the Macintosh Classic in June 1991. However, it retained its status as the best-selling PC-compatible computer for the remainder of 1991 and the first half of 1992. IBM officially withdrew the PS/2 Model 55 SX in May 1992, replacing it with the similarly specced PS/2 Models 56 and 57. In December 1993, IBM brought out the PS/2 Model 53 SLC2, which sported an almost identical case to the 55 SX but replaced the motherboard with one manufactured by Reply Corporation featuring the IBM 486SLC2 processor, clocked at 50 MHz.

== Reception ==
Despite its massive sales success, the Model 55 SX received mixed, generally negative, reviews in the press. Although the computer earned an Editors' Choice Award in PC Magazine in 1990, the magazine's Tom Unger had earlier wrote that, "Even with the loaded motherboard, some users may feel constrained by getting just three expansion slots", praising the solid construction and motherboard integration while panning the hard drive for being slow. InfoWorld's Eugene Wong called the Model 55 SX slower than most other 16-MHz 386SX machines despite being significantly more expensive. Russ Lockwood of Personal Computing found it the slowest of four 386SX machines reviewed and wrote that the Micro Channel architecture's potential for bus mastering was wasted on the drive controller and on-board graphics which were not capable of such. However, unlike Wong, he praised the motherboard's construction and called it price-competitive. In a review of several 386SX machines, PC World's T. J. Byers put it at the bottom of the list owing to its slow performance and limited potential for expansion.

== Submodels ==
IBM PS/2 Model 55 SX submodels
Model	IBM P/N	Processor	Clock speed (MHz)	Bus	No. of slots	No. of drive bays	FDD	HDD	Stock RAM	Maximum RAM	Video adapter	Monitor	Form factor	Date introduced	Notes	Ref(s).
55 SX	8555-031	Intel 386SX	16 (0–2 w)	MCA, 16-bit	3	2	one 1.44 MB	30 MB (ESDI)	2 MB	8 MB	VGA	optional	Desktop	May 1989		
55 SX	8555-041	Intel 386SX	16 (0–2 w)	MCA, 16-bit	3	2	one 1.44 MB	40 MB (ESDI)	2 MB	8 MB	VGA	optional	Desktop	June 1991		
55 SX	8555-061	Intel 386SX	16 (0–2 w)	MCA, 16-bit	3	2	one 1.44 MB	60 MB (ESDI)	2 MB	8 MB	VGA	optional	Desktop	May 1989		
55 SX	8555-081	Intel 386SX	16 (0–2 w)	MCA, 16-bit	3	2	one 1.44 MB	80 MB (ESDI)	2 MB	8 MB	VGA	optional	Desktop	June 1991		
55 LS	8555-LE0	Intel 386SX	16 (0–2 w)	MCA, 16-bit	3	2	none	none	2 MB	8 MB	VGA	optional	Desktop	October 1990		
55 LS	8555-LT0	Intel 386SX	16 (0–2 w)	MCA, 16-bit	3	2	none	none	2 MB	8 MB	VGA	optional	Desktop	October 1990		

== Successor models ==
IBM succeeded the Model 55 SX with the PS/2 Model 57 in 1991, the PS/2 Model 56 in 1992, and the PS/2 Model 53 SLC2 subfamilies in 1993. Each featured faster and more advanced microprocessors and, barring the Model 53 SLC2, redesigned cases. Neither three sold nearly as well as the PS/2 Model 55 SX; by late 1993, PC Week described the PS/2 line "beleaguered" as a whole due to diminishing market share and IBM's reputation for constant delays caused by parts shortages.

=== Model 57 ===
The PS/2 Model 57 was introduced by IBM in June 1991 as an upgrade to the PS/2 Model 55 SX; both were sold concurrently. The original PS/2 Model 57 SX features a 20-MHz 386SX processor, 25 percent faster than the 55 SX's own 386SX processor. In addition, it sports a much larger case than the Model 55 SX, accommodating two additional 16-bit Micro Channel expansion slots and two more drive bays. The Model 57 SX also increases the base amount of RAM to 4 MB, expandable to 16 MB. It was the first PS/2 model to come equipped with 2.88-MB, 3.5-inch "super" floppy disk drives manufactured by Toshiba. In October 1991, IBM introduced a multimedia PC version of the PS/2 Model 57 called the PS/2 Ultimedia M57 SLC. It features IBM's own manufactured microprocessor, the IBM 386SLC—a licensed clone of Intel's 386SX clocked at 20 MHz. IBM claimed a 88 percent increase in performance over Intel's 386SX at the same clock speed. As a multimedia PC, IBM included with the Ultimedia M57 SLC a CD-ROM XA drive; an XGA graphics adapter; a 16-bit sound card, the M-Audio Capture and Playback Adapter/A (M-ACPA); a SCSI host adapter for controlling up to seven SCSI devices; and front-mounted audio controls and speaker and headphone jacks.

In September 1992, after the Model 55 SX's discontinuation, IBM followed up the Model 57 SX with the PS/2 Model 57 486SLC2, featuring the 50-MHz IBM 486SLC2 processor. The 486SLC2 is a clock-doubled version of IBM's earlier 486SLC processor—itself a revamp of the IBM 386SLC. The 486SLC2 adds support for Intel's 486 instruction set while still possessing the same 16-bit external data bus as the 386SLC. The Model 57 486SLC2 is otherwise identical to the Model 57 SX in terms of its chassis, number of expansion slots, and maximum RAM. Simultaneous with this announcement, IBM announced a successor to the Ultimedia M57 SLC, the PS/2 Ultimedia M57 486SLC2, featuring the same IBM 486SLC2 processor as the Model 57 486SLC2. Customers were able to upgrade the 57 SX to the 57 486SLC2 with a drop-in processor upgrade kit for USD $259. The PS/2 Model 57 486SLC2 was among the first products of the newly formed IBM Personal Computer Company (IBM PC Co.), an autonomous subsidiary of IBM created earlier in the month. IBM followed up this model with the PS/2 Model 57 486SLC3 in February 1994. It featured a 16-bit variant of their 32-bit "Blue Lightning" IBM 486BL chip, clocked at 75 MHz. The Model 57 486SLC3 was otherwise identical to its predecessor, down to the case and expansion slots. Like its predecessor, Model 57 486SLC2 could be upgraded to the Model 57 486SLC3 with a drop-in upgrade kit.

IBM PS/2 Model 57 submodels
Model	IBM P/N	Processor	Clock speed (MHz)	Bus	No. of slots	No. of drive bays	FDD	HDD	Stock RAM	Maximum RAM	Video adapter	Monitor	Form factor	Date introduced	Notes	Ref(s).
57 SX	8557-045	Intel 386SX	20	MCA, 16-bit	5	4	one 2.88 MB	80 MB (SCSI)	4 MB	16 MB	VGA	optional	Desktop	June 1991		
57 SX	8557-049	Intel 386SX	20	MCA, 16-bit	5	4	one 2.88 MB	160 MB (SCSI)	4 MB	16 MB	VGA	optional	Desktop	June 1991		
57 SLC	8557-055	IBM 386SLC	20	MCA, 16-bit	5	4	one 2.88 MB	80 MB (SCSI)	4 MB	16 MB	VGA	optional	Desktop	February 1992	Token Ring	
57 SLC	8557-059	IBM 386SLC	20	MCA, 16-bit	5	4	one 2.88 MB	160 MB (SCSI)	8 MB	16 MB	VGA	optional	Desktop	February 1992		
57 SLC	8557-05F	IBM 386SLC	20	MCA, 16-bit	5	4	one 2.88 MB	400 MB (SCSI)	8 MB	16 MB	VGA	optional	Desktop	February 1992		
Ultimedia M57 SLC	8557-255	IBM 386SLC	20	MCA, 16-bit	5	4	one 2.88 MB	80 MB (SCSI)	4 MB	16 MB	VGA	optional	Desktop	February 1992		
Ultimedia M57 SLC	8557-259	IBM 386SLC	20	MCA, 16-bit	5	4	one 2.88 MB	160 MB (SCSI)	4 MB	16 MB	VGA	optional	Desktop	February 1992		
57 486SLC2	9557-0B6	IBM 486SLC2	50	MCA, 16-bit	5	4	one 2.88 MB	104 MB (SCSI)	8 MB	16 MB	XGA-2	optional	Desktop	September 1992		
57 486SLC2	9557-0BA	IBM 486SLC2	50	MCA, 16-bit	5	4	one 2.88 MB	212 MB (SCSI)	8 MB	16 MB	XGA-2	optional	Desktop	September 1992		
57 486SLC2	9557-0BF	IBM 486SLC2	50	MCA, 16-bit	5	4	one 2.88 MB	400 MB (SCSI)	8 MB	16 MB	XGA-2	optional	Desktop	Unknown		
57 486SLC2	9557-0BG	IBM 486SLC2	50	MCA, 16-bit	5	4	one 2.88 MB	540 MB (SCSI)	8 MB	16 MB	XGA-2	optional	Desktop	Unknown		
Ultimedia M57 486SLC2	9557-1BA	IBM 486SLC2	50	MCA, 16-bit	5	4	one 2.88 MB	212 MB (SCSI)	8 MB	16 MB	XGA-2	optional	Desktop	September 1992		
Ultimedia M57 486SLC2	9557-2BA	IBM 486SLC2	50	MCA, 16-bit	5	4	one 2.88 MB	212 MB (SCSI)	8 MB	16 MB	XGA-2	optional	Desktop	September 1992	ActionMedia II Adapter	
57 486SLC2	9557-DB6	IBM 486SLC2	50	MCA, 16-bit	5	4	one 2.88 MB	104 MB (SCSI)	8 MB	16 MB	XGA-2	optional	Desktop	October 1992		
57 486SLC2	9557-DBA	IBM 486SLC2	50	MCA, 16-bit	5	4	one 2.88 MB	212 MB (SCSI)	8 MB	16 MB	XGA-2	optional	Desktop	October 1992		
57 486SLC2	9557-DBG	IBM 486SLC2	50	MCA, 16-bit	5	4	one 2.88 MB	540 MB (SCSI)	8 MB	16 MB	XGA-2	optional	Desktop	July 1993		
57 486SLC2	9557-KB6	IBM 486SLC2	50	MCA, 16-bit	5	4	one 2.88 MB	104 MB (SCSI)	8 MB	16 MB	XGA-2	optional	Desktop	July 1993		
57 486SLC2	9557-KBA	IBM 486SLC2	50	MCA, 16-bit	5	4	one 2.88 MB	212 MB (SCSI)	8 MB	16 MB	XGA-2	optional	Desktop	July 1993		
57 486SLC2	9557-KBG	IBM 486SLC2	50	MCA, 16-bit	5	4	one 2.88 MB	540 MB (SCSI)	8 MB	16 MB	XGA-2	optional	Desktop	July 1993		
57 486SLC2	9557-QB6	IBM 486SLC2	50	MCA, 16-bit	5	4	one 2.88 MB	104 MB (SCSI)	8 MB	16 MB	XGA-2	optional	Desktop	April 1993		
57 486SLC2	9557-QBA	IBM 486SLC2	50	MCA, 16-bit	5	4	one 2.88 MB	212 MB (SCSI)	8 MB	16 MB	XGA-2	optional	Desktop	April 1993		
57 486SLC2	9557-V01	IBM 486SLC2	50	MCA, 16-bit	5	4	one 2.88 MB	2×212 MB (SCSI)	8 MB	16 MB	XGA-2	optional	Desktop	June 1992		
57 486SLC2	9557-xEB	IBM 486SLC2	50	MCA, 16-bit	5	4	one 2.88 MB	245 MB (SCSI)	8 MB	16 MB	XGA-2	optional	Desktop	January 1994		
57 486SLC2	9557-xEG	IBM 486SLC2	50	MCA, 16-bit	5	4	one 2.88 MB	540 MB (SCSI)	8 MB	16 MB	XGA-2	optional	Desktop	January 1994		
57 486SLC3	9557-DE9	IBM 486SLC3	75	MCA, 16-bit	5	5	one 2.88 MB	270 MB (SCSI)	8 MB	16 MB	XGA-2	optional	Desktop	February 1994		
57 486SLC3	9557-DEB	IBM 486SLC3	75	MCA, 16-bit	5	5	one 2.88 MB	540 MB (SCSI)	8 MB	16 MB	XGA-2	optional	Desktop	February 1994		
57 486SLC3	9557-DED	IBM 486SLC3	75	MCA, 16-bit	5	5	one 2.88 MB	270 MB (SCSI)	8 MB	16 MB	XGA-2	optional	Desktop	February 1994	Includes CD-ROM and audio card	
57 486SLC3	9557-DEG	IBM 486SLC3	75	MCA, 16-bit	5	5	one 2.88 MB	540 MB (SCSI)	8 MB	16 MB	XGA-2	optional	Desktop	February 1994	Includes CD-ROM and audio card	

=== Model 56 ===
The PS/2 Model 56 is the direct successor the Model 55 SX. Introduced by IBM in February 1992, it originally came in two variants: the PS/2 Model 56 SX, featuring a 20-MHz 386SX processor; and the PS/2 Model 56 SLC, featuring IBM's 386SLC processor, also clocked at 20 MHz. Despite being based on Intel's 386SX, IBM's 386SLC performed better in multiple benchmarks on account of the presence of L1 cache that Intel's 386SX lacks; per other benchmarks, the 386SLC even boasted superior performance than Intel's cacheful 25-MHz 386 processor. Both the Model 56 SX and the Model 56 SLC feature three 16-bit Micro Channel architecture slots, VGA graphics, and 4 MB of RAM stock, expandable to 16 MB. Customers were able to upgrade the 56 SX to the 56 SLC with a drop-in processor upgrade kit. Both models were available in diskless workstation variants—the PS/2 Model 56 LS and the PS/2 Model 56 SLC LS—with either a Token Ring or an Ethernet adapter. There was available 20/40 MHz 486SLC2 upgrade kit for this model for USD $259 for certain models.

In September 1992, IBM introduced the PS/2 Model 56 486SLC2, featuring the 50-MHz IBM 486SLC2 processor. The Model 56 486SLC2 sports the same case and three MCA expansion slots as its predecessor; like the Model 56 SX before it, customers could upgrade the 56 SLC to the 56 486SLC2 with a drop-in processor upgrade kit. Along with the Model 57 486SLC2, the Model 56 486SLC2 was among the first products of IBM PC Co. IBM followed up this model with the PS/2 Model 56 486SLC3 in February 1994, featuring IBM's 75 MHz Blue Lightning chip. The Model 56 486SLC3 was otherwise identical to its predecessor, down to the case and expansion slots. Unlike the Model 56 486SLC2, the Model 56 486SLC3 came in a diskless workstation variant, the PS/2 Model 56 486SLC3 LS, equipped with either a Token Ring or an Ethernet adapter.

IBM PS/2 Model 56 submodels
Model	IBM P/N	Processor	Clock speed (MHz)	Bus	No. of slots	No. of drive bays	FDD	HDD	Stock RAM	Maximum RAM	Video adapter	Monitor	Form factor	Date introduced	Notes	Ref(s).
56 SX	8556-043	Intel 386SX	20	MCA, 16-bit	3	2	one 2.88 MB	40 MB (SCSI)	4 MB	8 MB	VGA	optional	Desktop	February 1992		
56 SX	8556-045	Intel 386SX	20	MCA, 16-bit	3	3	one 2.88 MB	80 MB (SCSI)	4 MB	8 MB	VGA	optional	Desktop	February 1992		
56 SX	8556-049	Intel 386SX	20	MCA, 16-bit	3	3	one 2.88 MB	160 MB (SCSI)	4 MB	8 MB	VGA	optional	Desktop	February 1992		
56 LS	8556-14X	Intel 386SX	20	MCA, 16-bit	3	3	none	none	4 MB	8 MB	VGA	optional	Desktop	February 1992	Ethernet	
56 LS	8556-24X	Intel 386SX	20	MCA, 16-bit	3	3	none	none	4 MB	8 MB	VGA	optional	Desktop	February 1992	Token Ring	
56 SLC	8556-053	IBM 386SLC	20	MCA, 16-bit	3	2	one 2.88 MB	40 MB (SCSI)	4 MB	16 MB	VGA	optional	Desktop	Unknown		
56 SLC	8556-055	IBM 386SLC	20	MCA, 16-bit	3	2	one 2.88 MB	80 MB (SCSI)	4 MB	16 MB	VGA	optional	Desktop	February 1992		
56 SLC	8556-059	IBM 386SLC	20	MCA, 16-bit	3	2	one 2.88 MB	160 MB (SCSI)	4 MB	16 MB	VGA	optional	Desktop	February 1992		
56 SLC LS	8556-25X	IBM 386SLC	20	MCA, 16-bit	3	2	none	none	4 MB	16 MB	VGA	optional	Desktop	February 1992	Token Ring	
56 SLC LS	8556-15X	IBM 386SLC	20	MCA, 16-bit	3	2	none	none	4 MB	16 MB	VGA	optional	Desktop	February 1992	Ethernet	
56 486SLC2	9556-0B6	IBM 486SLC2	50	MCA, 16-bit	3	2	one 2.88 MB	104 MB (SCSI)	8 MB	16 MB	XGA-2	optional	Desktop	September 1992		
56 486SLC2	9556-0BA	IBM 486SLC2	50	MCA, 16-bit	3	2	one 2.88 MB	212 MB (SCSI)	8 MB	16 MB	XGA-2	optional	Desktop	September 1992		
56 486SLC2	9556-1BX	IBM 486SLC2	50	MCA, 16-bit	3	2	one 2.88 MB	none	4 MB	16 MB	XGA-2	optional	Desktop	Unknown	Ethernet	
56 486SLC2	9556-2BX	IBM 486SLC2	50	MCA, 16-bit	3	2	one 2.88 MB	none	4 MB	16 MB	XGA-2	optional	Desktop	Unknown	Token Ring	
56 486SLC2	9556-ABX	IBM 486SLC2	50	MCA, 16-bit	3	2	one 2.88 MB	none	4 MB	16 MB	XGA-2	optional	Desktop	Unknown		
56 486SLC2	9556-DB6	IBM 486SLC2	50	MCA, 16-bit	3	2	one 2.88 MB	104 MB (SCSI)	8 MB	16 MB	XGA-2	optional	Desktop	October 1992		
56 486SLC2	9556-DBA	IBM 486SLC2	50	MCA, 16-bit	3	2	one 2.88 MB	212 MB (SCSI)	8 MB	16 MB	XGA-2	optional	Desktop	October 1992		
56 486SLC2	9556-KB6	IBM 486SLC2	50	MCA, 16-bit	3	2	one 2.88 MB	104 MB (SCSI)	8 MB	16 MB	XGA-2	optional	Desktop	May 1993		
56 486SLC2	9556-KBA	IBM 486SLC2	50	MCA, 16-bit	3	2	one 2.88 MB	212 MB (SCSI)	8 MB	16 MB	XGA-2	optional	Desktop	May 1993		
56 486SLC2	9556-QB6	IBM 486SLC2	50	MCA, 16-bit	3	2	one 2.88 MB	104 MB (SCSI)	8 MB	16 MB	XGA-2	optional	Desktop	May 1993		
56 486SLC2	9556-QBA	IBM 486SLC2	50	MCA, 16-bit	3	2	one 2.88 MB	212 MB (SCSI)	8 MB	16 MB	XGA-2	optional	Desktop	May 1993		
56 486SLC3	9556-DE9	IBM 486SLC3	75	MCA, 16-bit	3	3	one 2.88 MB	170 MB (SCSI)	8 MB	16 MB	XGA-2	optional	Desktop	February 1994		
56 486SLC3	9556-DEB	IBM 486SLC3	75	MCA, 16-bit	3	3	one 2.88 MB	270 MB (SCSI)	8 MB	16 MB	XGA-2	optional	Desktop	February 1994		
56 486SLC3	9556-DED	IBM 486SLC3	75	MCA, 16-bit	3	3	one 2.88 MB	340 MB (SCSI)	8 MB	16 MB	XGA-2	optional	Desktop	February 1994		
56 486SLC3 LS	9556-1EX	IBM 486SLC3	75	MCA, 16-bit	3	3	none	none	4 MB	16 MB	XGA-2	optional	Desktop	February 1994	Ethernet	
56 486SLC3 LS	9556-2EX	IBM 486SLC3	75	MCA, 16-bit	3	3	none	none	4 MB	16 MB	XGA-2	optional	Desktop	February 1994	Token Ring	

=== Model 53 486SLC2 ===
The PS/2 Model 53 486SLC2 was introduced by IBM in November 1993 as the company's new lowest-end model in the PS/2 lineup. It features the 50-MHz IBM 486SLC2 processor, between 4 MB and 16 MB of RAM, and either a 120-MB or a 250-MB hard drive. IBM also offered a diskless workstation variant branded as the PS/2 Model 53 LS, with either a Token Ring or an Ethernet adapter. Like the Model 55 SX, the Model 53 486SLC2 features three 16-bit Micro Channel slots and VGA graphics.

IBM outsourced the design of the Model 53 486SLC2 in large part to Reply Corporation, a major vendor of aftermarket upgrade products for the PS/2. Reply largely borrowed wholesale the case design of the Model 55 SX for the Model 53 486SLC2, unlike the Model 56 and Model 57, which were ground-up redesigns. The Model 53 486SLC2's motherboard was originally marketed by Reply as a standalone upgrade motherboard called the PS/2 Model 55SX TurboProcessor, released earlier in February 1993.

IBM PS/2 Model 53 submodels
Model	IBM P/N	Processor	Clock speed (MHz)	Bus	No. of slots	No. of drive bays	FDD	HDD	Stock RAM	Maximum RAM	Video adapter	Monitor	Form factor	Date introduced	Notes	Ref(s).
53 486SLC2	9553-0B7	IBM 486SLC2	50	MCA, 16-bit	3	3	one 1.44 MB	120 MB (IDE)	4 MB	16 MB	SVGA	optional	Desktop	November 1993	Reply board	
53 486SLC2	9553-0BB	IBM 486SLC2	50	MCA, 16-bit	3	3	one 1.44 MB	250 MB (IDE)	4 MB	16 MB	SVGA	optional	Desktop	November 1993	Reply board	
53 LS	9553-1BX	IBM 486SLC2	50	MCA, 16-bit	3	3	none	none	4 MB	16 MB	SVGA	optional	Desktop	November 1993	Reply board, Ethernet	
53 LS	9553-2BX	IBM 486SLC2	50	MCA, 16-bit	3	3	none	none	4 MB	16 MB	SVGA	optional	Desktop	November 1993	Reply board, Token Ring	
