= IBM PS/2 Model 25 =

1987 IBM desktop computer

Personal System/2 Model 25
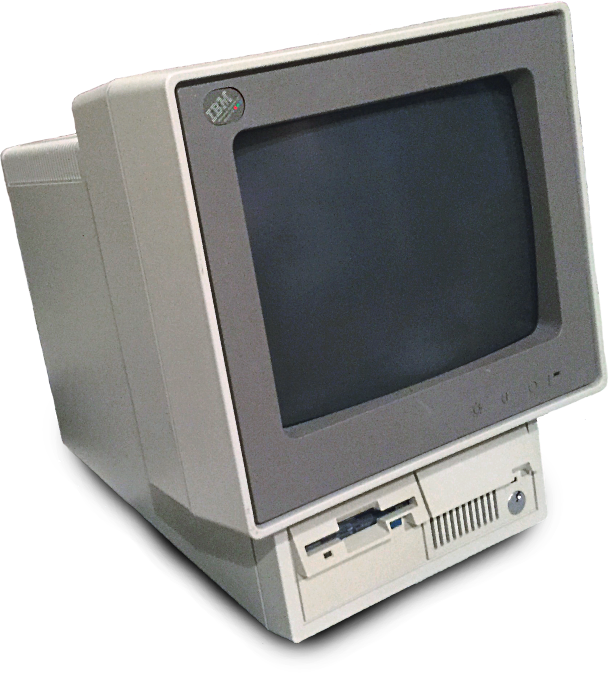
- An original PS/2 Model 25
- Developer: International Business Machines Corporation (IBM)
- Manufacturer: IBM
- Product family: Personal System/2
- Type: Personal computer
- Released: August 4, 1987; 38 years ago
- CPU: Intel 8086 at 8 MHz (Model 25); Intel 80286 at 10 MHz (Model 25 286); Intel 80386SX at 20 MHz (Model 25 SX)
- Graphics: Multi-Color Graphics Array (Model 25); Video Graphics Array (Models 25 286 and 25 SX)
- Power: 120/240 VAC ～
- Related: List of IBM PS/2 models

The Personal System/2 Model 25 and its later submodels the 25 286 and 25 SX are IBM's lowest-end entries in the Personal System/2 (PS/2) family of personal computers. Like its sibling the Model 30, the Model 25 features an Industry Standard Architecture bus, allowing it to use expansion cards from its direct predecessors, the PC/XT and the PC/AT—but not from higher entries in the PS/2 line, which use Micro Channel. Unlike all other entries in the PS/2 line, the Model 25 and its submodels are built into an all-in-one form factor, with its cathode-ray tube (CRT) monitor and system board occupying the same enclosure. IBM oriented the Model 25 at home office workers and students.

== Development and release ==
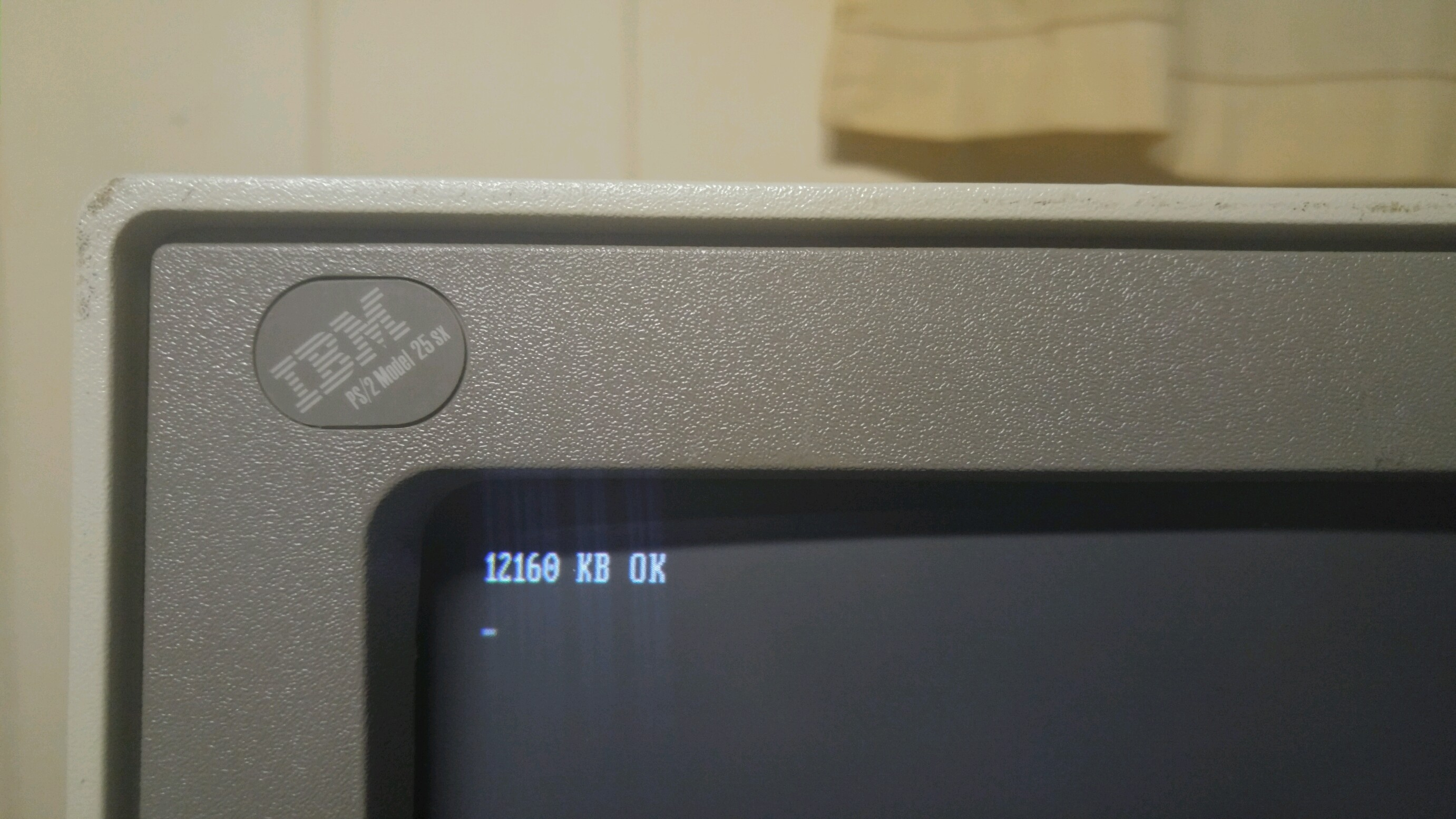
Case badge on a Model 25 SX

IBM unveiled the Model 25 on August 4, 1987. It is the fifth entry of the Personal System/2 range. The first Model 25 is powered by an Intel 8086 running at 8 MHz, roughly twice the speed of the original IBM Personal Computer. A college student-oriented version of the Model 25, the Collegiate, has two 720 KB floppy drives, with a maximum RAM capacity of 640 KB, and was packaged with the official PS/2 Mouse, Windows 1.04, and four blank floppy disks.

In 1990, IBM released the Model 25 286, which upgrades the original to an Intel 80286 running at 10 MHz. In late 1991, IBM's Boca Raton facility, led by José García, developed the Model 25 SX, which features an Intel 80386SX clocked at 20 MHz. This version of the Model 25 was sold only to K–12 schools. The Model 25 series was never officially sold outside of the United States.

IBM neither included nor supported hard disk drives in the original Model 25, although several aftermarket kits were available by late 1987. The later 25 286 and 25 SX were sold with a hard drive as an option.

== Reception ==
Multiple contemporary reviewers compared the Model 25 to Apple's original Macintosh. Stephen Satchell of InfoWorld wrote when he first saw the Model 25 on its announcement: "[M]y immediate impression was that I was looking at a deformed Macintosh. When the stage lights came up, the illusion was shattered and I saw the similarity to the rest of the PS/2 line."

David E. Sanger of The New York Times called the computer perhaps "the most attractive computer" that IBM had ever designed for people who only used their computer for up to a couple hours a day and while a "touch overpriced," it was "relatively inexpensive for an IBM." Sangler and Gus Venditto of PC Magazine were frustrated by the Model 25's lack of a built-in hard disk drive. Venditto wrote that, on launch, contemporary aftermarket hard drives were too large to be installed in either of the computer's two floppy drive bays—with no announcements for a hard drive solution for the Model 25 on the horizon. He also observed that the space for the top ISA slot on the riser is partially obstructed by the CRT monitor, preventing full-height cards from fitting into that slot. On the whole, he appreciated the sturdily built chassis and concluded that the Model 25 was a "well-crafted, fast computer for places where real estate is at a premium."

== Submodels ==
IBM PS/2 Model 25 submodels
Model	IBM P/N	Processor	Clock speed (MHz)	Bus	No. of slots	No. of drive bays	FDD	HDD	Stock RAM	Maximum RAM	Video adapter	Monitor	Form factor	Date introduced	Notes	Ref(s).
25	8525-001	Intel 8086	8 (0 w)	ISA, 8-bit	2	2	one 720 KB	none	512 KB	640 KB	MCGA	12-in. monochrome	All-in-one	August 1987	Space Saving Keyboard	
25	8525-004	Intel 8086	8 (0 w)	ISA, 8-bit	2	2	one 720 KB	none	512 KB	640 KB	MCGA	12-in. color	All-in-one	August 1987	Space Saving Keyboard	
25	8525-G01	Intel 8086	8 (0 w)	ISA, 8-bit	2	2	one 720 KB	none	512 KB	640 KB	MCGA	12-in. monochrome	All-in-one	August 1987		
25	8525-G04	Intel 8086	8 (0 w)	ISA, 8-bit	2	2	one 720 KB	none	512 KB	640 KB	MCGA	12-in. color	All-in-one	August 1987		
25 Collegiate	8525-C02	Intel 8086	8 (0 w)	ISA, 8-bit	2	2	two 720 KB	none	640 KB	640 KB	MCGA	12-in. monochrome	All-in-one	August 1987	Space Saving Keyboard	
25 Collegiate	8525-C05	Intel 8086	8 (0 w)	ISA, 8-bit	2	2	two 720 KB	none	640 KB	640 KB	MCGA	12-in. color	All-in-one	August 1987	Space Saving Keyboard	
25 Collegiate	8525-K02	Intel 8086	8 (0 w)	ISA, 8-bit	2	2	two 720 KB	none	640 KB	640 KB	MCGA	12-in. monochrome	All-in-one	August 1987		
25 Collegiate	8525-K05	Intel 8086	8 (0 w)	ISA, 8-bit	2	2	two 720 KB	none	640 KB	640 KB	MCGA	12-in. color	All-in-one	August 1987		
25 LS	8525-L01	Intel 8086	8 (0 w)	ISA, 8-bit	2	2	one 720 KB	none	512 KB	640 KB	MCGA	12-in. monochrome	All-in-one	August 1987	Token Ring	
25 LS	8525-L04	Intel 8086	8 (0 w)	ISA, 8-bit	2	2	one 720 KB	none	512 KB	640 KB	MCGA	12-in. color	All-in-one	August 1987	Token Ring	
25 286	8525-006	Intel 80286	10 (1 w)	ISA, 16-bit	2	2	one 1.44 MB	none	1 MB	4 MB	VGA	12-in. color	All-in-one	October 1990	Space Saving Keyboard	
25 286	8525-036	Intel 80286	10 (1 w)	ISA, 16-bit	2	2	one 1.44 MB	30 MB (ST-506)	1 MB	4 MB	VGA	12-in. color	All-in-one	October 1990		
25 286	8525-G06	Intel 80286	10 (1 w)	ISA, 16-bit	2	2	one 1.44 MB	none	1 MB	4 MB	VGA	12-in. color	All-in-one	October 1990	Space Saving Keyboard	
25 286	8525-G36	Intel 80286	10 (1 w)	ISA, 16-bit	2	2	one 1.44 MB	30 MB (ST-506)	1 MB	4 MB	VGA	12-in. color	All-in-one	October 1990		
25 SX	8525-K00	Intel 386SX	20	ISA, 16-bit	3	2	one 1.44 MB	none	1 MB	16 MB	VGA	12-in. color	All-in-one	April 1992		
25 SX	8525-K01	Intel 386SX	20	ISA, 16-bit	3	2	one 1.44 MB	none	1 MB	16 MB	VGA	12-in. color	All-in-one	April 1992	Ethernet	
25 SX	8525-L02	Intel 386SX	20	ISA, 16-bit	3	2	one 1.44 MB	none	1 MB	16 MB	VGA	12-in. color	All-in-one	April 1992	Token Ring	
