= IBM 386SLC =

Intel-licensed version of the 386SX

The 386SLC is an Intel-licensed version of the 386SX (32-bit internal, 16-bit external, 24-bit memory addressing), developed and manufactured by IBM in 1991. It included power-management capabilities and an 8KB internal CPU cache, which enabled it to yield comparable performance to 386DX processors of the same clock speed, which were considerably more expensive. Known inside IBM as "Super Little Chip" for its initials, it was used in the IBM PS/2 35, 40 and 56 Series and in the IBM PS/ValuePoint 325T, but never gained much market share. This was mainly due to an agreement with Intel, in which IBM was not allowed to sell their CPUs if they were not part of a system or upgrade board. It was also marketed as an optional upgrade for 8086-equipped IBM PS/2 25 Series computers.

== Design and Technology ==
Built with complementary metal oxide semiconductor (CMOS) technology, the IBM 386SLC had a 161-square millimeter die. It was available with clock speeds of 16, 20, and 25 MHz. The 25 MHz model produced only 2.5 watts of dissipated power, making it especially well suited for laptops and other portable devices.

Despite the fact that the SLC and DLC chips are bus compatible with i386SX and i386DX respectively, they can not be used as drop-in replacements as they are not pin-compatible.

== IBM 486SLC ==
The 486SLC is an improved version of the IBM 386SLC, based on the Intel core. IBM 486SLC featured 16KB of L1 cache and the i486 instruction set. It had 1.349 million transistors and a 69 mm^{2} die. It was manufactured in 1992. It came in a 100-pin BQFP package, with 33 MHz FSB speed. The 486SLC was also available in a clock-doubled version, the 486SLC2 (50 & 66 MHz), and later in a clock-tripled version, the 486SLC3 (60, 75, & 100 MHz). The 20/40 MHz 486SLC2 was available for an upgrade for IBM PS/2 Models 56 and 57 for USD $259. This CPU performs 271% faster than most 20 MHz 386SX system, 99% faster than 20 MHz 386SLC system, 53% faster than 20 MHz 486SX system and 20% faster than 25 MHz 486SX system claimed by IBM. Clock-for-clock, it was substantially faster than the similarly named Cyrix part, yielding performance broadly comparable to a similarly clocked 486SX in the 16-bit applications of its day. However, its narrow 16-bit bus, limited memory addressing capability (16 MB) and lack of on-chip FPU would prove to be major disadvantages under the new generation of 32-bit operating systems (such as Windows 95) that would become popular in following years.

It is suspected the clock tripled 486SLC3 part did not in fact actually exist as a stand-alone product. All known instances of 486SLC3 CPUs are reportedly in the 132-pin PQFP packaging with the extra address lines not connected (a 486BL3 running in 16-bit mode).

== IBM 486BL (Blue Lightning) ==
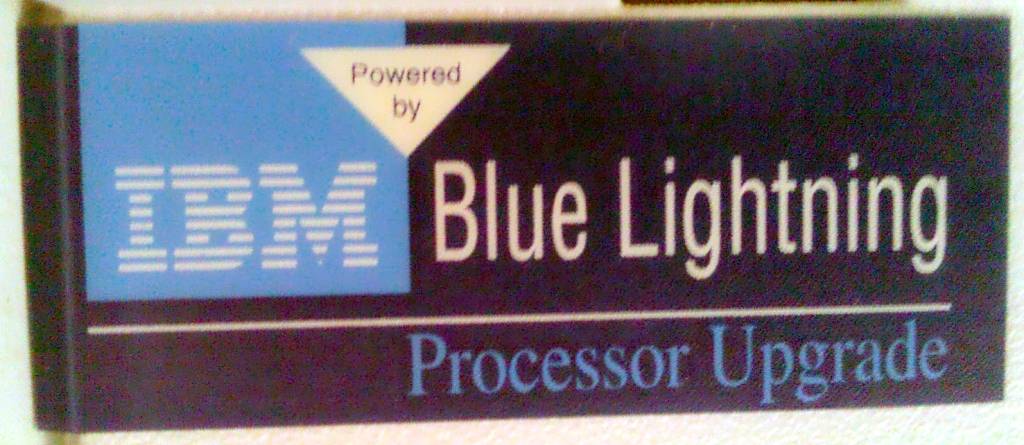
Blue Lightning upgrade badge

The 486BL is a fully 32-bit version of the 486SLC, with 1.4 million transistors on an 82 mm^{2} die, using a 0.8 μm CMOS process. It came in a 132-pin QFP package. In July, 1993 IBM produced clock-doubled and clock-tripled versions of the chip, the 486BL2 and 486BL3. The chips were available from 50 to 100 MHz and were sold by IBM only.

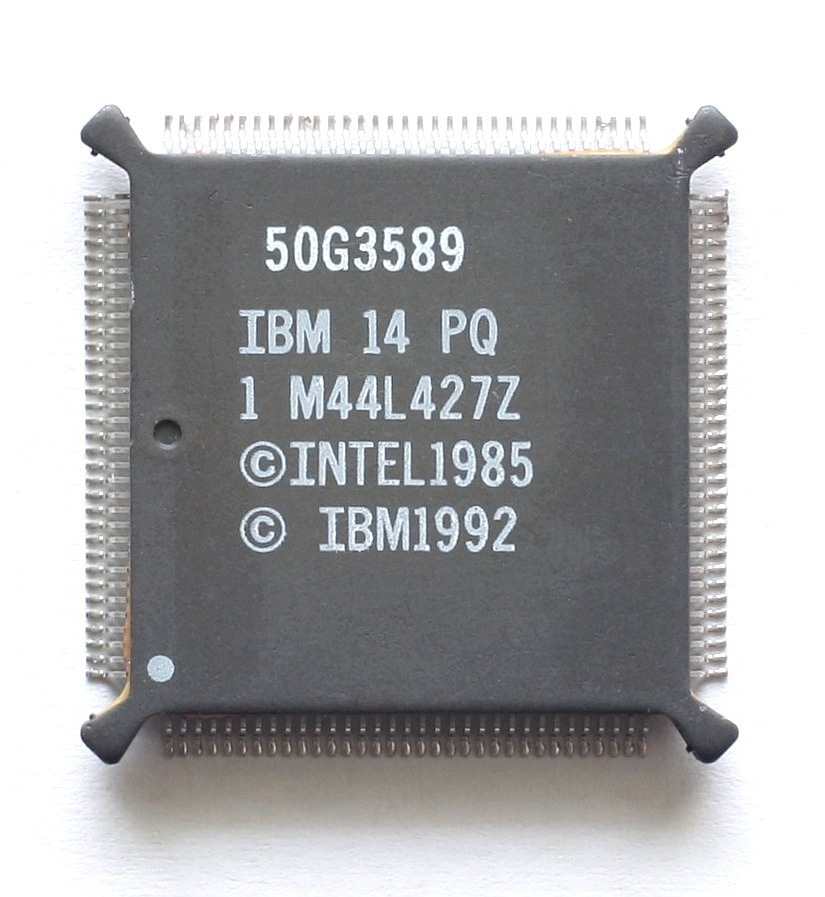
IBM 486BL2

IBM later marketed Socket 3 168-pin PGA Blue Lightning 486 CPUs, but these are technically not related to earlier Blue Lightning models as they are based on the Cyrix Cx486 CPU core. They can be distinguished by the inclusion of a "DX" (or DX2, DX4) legend somewhere on the label, setting them apart from the earlier 386-derived, nominally 486SX-equivalent processors.

IBM's adoption of Cyrix cores for their self-manufactured CPUs, very restricted release of information regarding the earlier generations, and policy of only printing cryptic in-house part numbers on first-generation Blue Lightning chips rather than any easily recognised family name has led to some confusion amongst the retro/low-end PC community as to their actual name. As a result, the first-generation BLs are often commonly referred to as "486DLC" (and 486DLC2, DLC3/4) CPUs, a logical and 386-alike progression from the 16-bit SLC models - even though IBM themselves do not appear to have used that name in any official materials, simply calling them "Blue Lightning" or shortening the name to "486BL". The "486DLC" name itself is instead one used by Cyrix for their wholly distinct (from IBM/Intel's product) predecessors to the "4x86" generation (itself the basis of IBM's later 486DX line), as openly and clearly printed on the processor cases. However, in the absence of any better common name for the line, "IBM 486DLC" has stuck, and in practice it would be difficult to confuse any two of the three different model lines for each other due to clearly different packaging and branding.

== See also ==
- Intel 386
- IBM PS/2
- IBM PS/ValuePoint
- IBM ThinkPad
- IBM 5x86C - based on the Cyrix core
- IBM Personal Computer
