= List of IBM Personal Computer models =

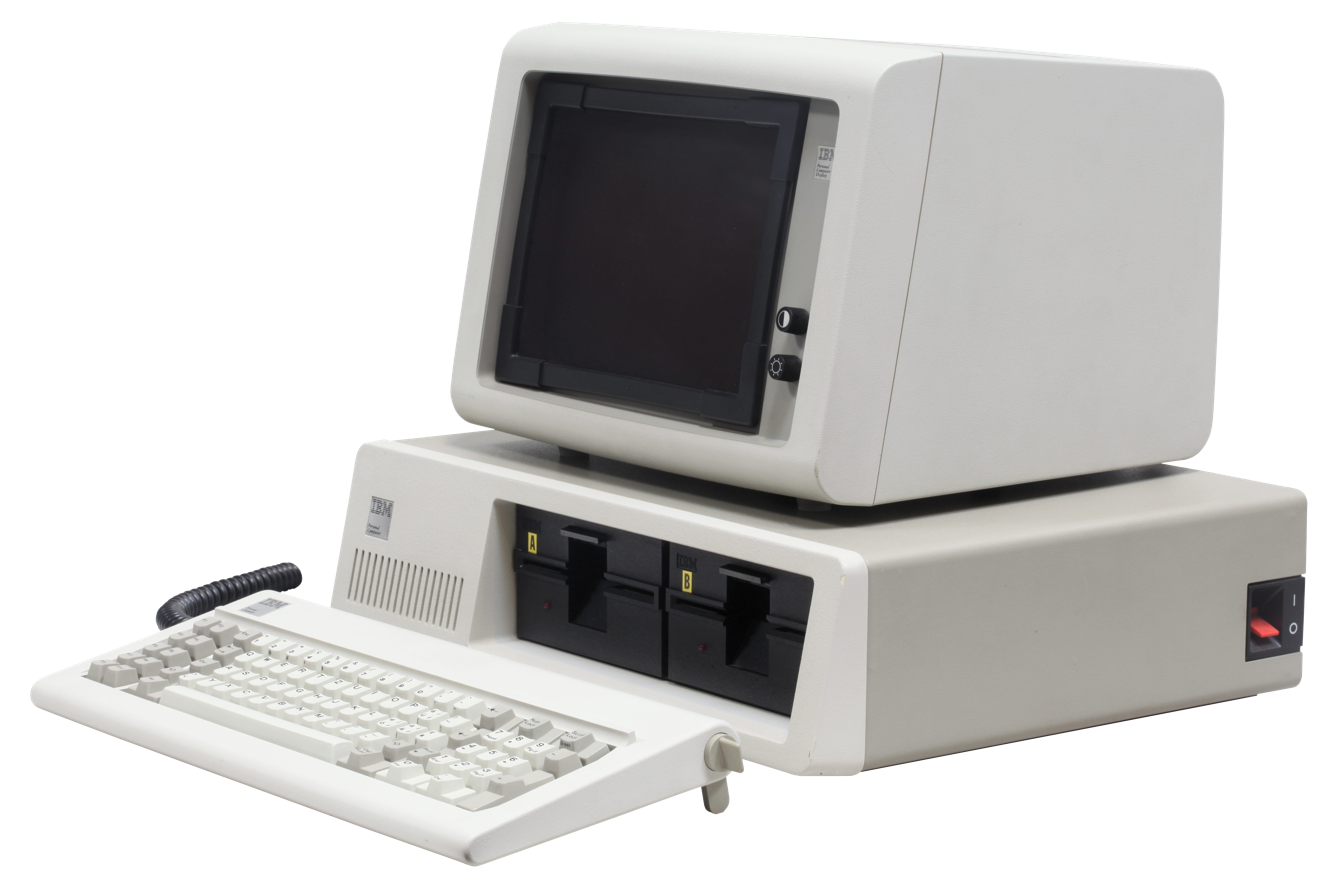
The original IBM Personal Computer, with monitor and keyboard

The IBM Personal Computer, commonly known as the IBM PC, spanned multiple models in its first generation (including the PCjr, the Portable PC, the XT, the AT, the Convertible, and the /370 systems, among others), from 1981 to 1987. It eventually gave way to many splintering product lines after IBM introduced the Personal System/2 in April 1987.

== Notes ==
Legend

ISA, 8-bit
ISA, 16-bit
Other

== Models ==
=== Original line ===
IBM Personal Computer AT models
Type	IBM P/N	Date announced	Date withdrawn	Bus	No. of slots	No. of bays	Processor	Clock speed (MHz)	Stock onboard RAM (KB)	Maximum onboard RAM (KB)	FDD	HDD	Notes	Ref(s).
Personal Computer	5150-001	August 1981	March 1983	ISA, 8-bit	5	2	Intel 8088	4.77	16 KB	64 KB	none	none	Diskless model; only means of data storage is through IBM Cassette BASIC	
Personal Computer	5150-003	August 1981	March 1983	ISA, 8-bit	5	2	Intel 8088	4.77	48 KB	64 KB	160 KB	none	Single-sided, double-density floppy disk drive	
Personal Computer	5150-013	Unknown	Unknown	ISA, 8-bit	5	2	Intel 8088	4.77	Unknown	Unknown	Unknown	Unknown		
Personal Computer	5150-014	Unknown	March 1983	ISA, 8-bit	5	2	Intel 8088	4.77	64 KB	64 KB	160 KB	none		
Personal Computer	5150-064	Unknown	March 1983	ISA, 8-bit	5	2	Intel 8088	4.77	64 KB	64 KB	320 KB	none		
Personal Computer	5150-074	Unknown	March 1983	ISA, 8-bit	5	2	Intel 8088	4.77	64 KB	64 KB	two 320 KB	none		
Personal Computer	5150-X14	Unknown	March 1983	ISA, 8-bit	5	2	Intel 8088	4.77	64 KB	64 KB	160 KB	none	Shipped without keyboard; includes adapter for integration with IBM 3278 terminal systems	
Personal Computer	5150-X64	Unknown	March 1983	ISA, 8-bit	5	2	Intel 8088	4.77	64 KB	64 KB	320 KB	none	Shipped without keyboard; includes adapter for integration with IBM 3278 terminal systems	
Personal Computer	5150-X74	Unknown	March 1983	ISA, 8-bit	5	2	Intel 8088	4.77	64 KB	64 KB	two 320 KB	none	Shipped without keyboard; includes adapter for integration with IBM 3278 terminal systems	
Personal Computer	5150-114	Unknown	June 1984	ISA, 8-bit	5	2	Intel 8088	4.77	64 KB	256 KB	160 KB	none		
Personal Computer	5150-164	Unknown	June 1984	ISA, 8-bit	5	2	Intel 8088	4.77	64 KB	256 KB	320 KB	none		
Personal Computer	5150-174	Unknown	June 1984	ISA, 8-bit	5	2	Intel 8088	4.77	64 KB	256 KB	two 320 KB	none		
Personal Computer	5150-104	June 1984	April 1987	ISA, 8-bit	5	2	Intel 8088	4.77	64 KB	256 KB	none	none	Diskless model; only means of data storage is through IBM Cassette BASIC	
Personal Computer	5150-166	June 1984	April 1987	ISA, 8-bit	5	2	Intel 8088	4.77	256 KB	256 KB	360 KB	none		
Personal Computer	5150-176	June 1984	April 1987	ISA, 8-bit	5	2	Intel 8088	4.77	256 KB	256 KB	two 360 KB	none		
Personal Computer	5150-X66	June 1984	December 1985	ISA, 8-bit	5	2	Intel 8088	4.77	256 KB	256 KB	360 KB	none	Shipped without keyboard	
Personal Computer	5150-X76	June 1984	December 1985	ISA, 8-bit	5	2	Intel 8088	4.77	256 KB	256 KB	two 360 KB	none	Shipped without keyboard	
Personal Computer XT	5160-087	March 1983	June 1984	ISA, 8-bit	8	2	Intel 8088	4.77	128 KB	640 KB	360 KB	10 MB		
Personal Computer XT	5160-086	June 1984	June 1987	ISA, 8-bit	8	2	Intel 8088	4.77	256 KB	640 KB	360 KB	10 MB		
Personal Computer XT	5160-068	April 1985	June 1987	ISA, 8-bit	8	2	Intel 8088	4.77	256 KB	640 KB	360 KB	none		
Personal Computer XT	5160-078	April 1985	June 1987	ISA, 8-bit	8	2	Intel 8088	4.77	256 KB	640 KB	two 360 KB	none		
Personal Computer XT	5160-088	April 1986	June 1987	ISA, 8-bit	8	2	Intel 8088	4.77	512 KB	640 KB	360 KB	20 MB	Shipped with original IBM PC "Model F" keyboard	
Personal Computer XT	5160-089	April 1986	June 1987	ISA, 8-bit	8	2	Intel 8088	4.77	512 KB	640 KB	360 KB	20 MB	Shipped with Enhanced Keyboard	
Personal Computer XT	5160-267	April 1986	June 1987	ISA, 8-bit	8	2	Intel 8088	4.77	256 KB	640 KB	360 KB	none	Shipped with original IBM PC "Model F" keyboard	
Personal Computer XT	5160-268	April 1986	June 1987	ISA, 8-bit	8	2	Intel 8088	4.77	256 KB	640 KB	360 KB	none	Shipped with Enhanced Keyboard	
Personal Computer XT	5160-277	April 1986	June 1987	ISA, 8-bit	8	2	Intel 8088	4.77	256 KB	640 KB	two 360 KB	none	Shipped with original IBM PC "Model F" keyboard	
Personal Computer XT	5160-278	April 1986	June 1987	ISA, 8-bit	8	2	Intel 8088	4.77	256 KB	640 KB	two 360 KB	none	Shipped with Enhanced Keyboard	
3270 PC	5271-000	Unknown	July 1987	ISA, 8-bit	8	2	Intel 8088	4.77	256 KB	640 KB	360 KB	none	Without printer adapter, fixed disk adapter, and keyboard	
3270 PC	5271-002	October 1983	July 1987	ISA, 8-bit	8	2	Intel 8088	4.77	256 KB	640 KB	360 KB	none	Without printer adapter and fixed disk adapter	
3270 PC	5271-004	October 1983	July 1987	ISA, 8-bit	8	2	Intel 8088	4.77	320 KB	640 KB	360 KB	none	Without fixed disk adapter; stock onboard RAM increased to 384 KB in June 1984	
3270 PC	5271-006	October 1983	July 1987	ISA, 8-bit	8	2	Intel 8088	4.77	320 KB	640 KB	360 KB	10 MB	With fixed disk adapter; stock onboard RAM increased to 384 KB in June 1984	
Personal Computer XT/370	5160-568	October 1984	April 1987	ISA, 8-bit	8	2	Intel 8088	4.77	256 KB	640 KB	360 KB	none		
Personal Computer XT/370	5160-588	October 1984	April 1987	ISA, 8-bit	8	2	Intel 8088	4.77	256 KB	640 KB	360 KB	10 MB		
Personal Computer XT/370	5160-589	October 1984	April 1987	ISA, 8-bit	8	2	Intel 8088	4.77	256 KB	640 KB	360 KB	10 MB		
PCjr	4860-004	November 1983	March 1985	Custom	—	—	Intel 8088	4.77	64 KB	128 KB	none	none		
PCjr	4860-067	November 1983	March 1985	Custom	—	—	Intel 8088	4.77	128 KB	128 KB	360 KB	none		
Portable Personal Computer	5155-068	February 1984	June 1984	ISA, 8-bit	8	2	Intel 8088	4.77	256 KB	512 KB	360 KB	none		
Portable Personal Computer	5155-076	June 1984	Unknown	ISA, 8-bit	8	2	Intel 8088	4.77	256 KB	512 KB	two 360 KB	none		
Personal Computer AT	5170-068	August 1984	June 1987	ISA, 16-bit	8	3	Intel 80286	6	256 KB	512 KB	1.2 MB	none		
Personal Computer AT	5170-099	August 1984	June 1987	ISA, 16-bit	8	3	Intel 80286	6	512 KB	512 KB	1.2 MB	20 MB		
Personal Computer AT	5170-239	October 1985	September 1986	ISA, 16-bit	8	3	Intel 80286	6	512 KB	512 KB	1.2 MB	30 MB		
Personal Computer AT	5170-839	January 1986	June 1987	ISA, 16-bit	8	3	Intel 80286	6	512 KB	512 KB	1.2 MB	two 30 MB	Includes controllers for the IBM 4680 Store System	
Personal Computer AT	5170-899	January 1986	June 1987	ISA, 16-bit	8	3	Intel 80286	6	512 KB	512 KB	1.2 MB	two 20 MB	Includes controllers for the IBM 4680 Store System	
Personal Computer AT	5170-319	April 1986	June 1987	ISA, 16-bit	8	3	Intel 80286	8	512 KB	512 KB	1.2 MB	30 MB		
Personal Computer AT	5170-339	April 1986	July 1987	ISA, 16-bit	8	3	Intel 80286	8	512 KB	512 KB	1.2 MB	30 MB	Shipped with Enhanced Keyboard	
Personal Computer AT	5171-168	October 1986	June 1987	ISA, 16-bit	8	3	Intel 80286	8	512 KB	512 KB	1.2 MB	none	Built to TEMPEST specifications	
Personal Computer AT	5171-339	October 1986	July 1987	ISA, 16-bit	8	3	Intel 80286	8	512 KB	512 KB	1.2 MB	30 MB	Built to TEMPEST specifications	
Personal Computer AT/370	5170-599	October 1984	April 1987	ISA, 16-bit	8	3	Intel 80286	6	512 KB	512 KB	1.2 MB	20 MB		
Personal Computer AT/370	5170-739	October 1985	April 1987	ISA, 16-bit	8	3	Intel 80286	6	512 KB	512 KB	1.2 MB	30 MB		
Personal Computer AT/370	5170-919	April 1986	April 1987	ISA, 16-bit	8	3	Intel 80286	6	512 KB	512 KB	1.2 MB	30 MB	1 MB total RAM (peripheral)	
Personal Computer AT/370	5170-939	April 1986	April 1987	ISA, 16-bit	8	3	Intel 80286	6	512 KB	512 KB	1.2 MB	30 MB	1 MB total RAM (peripheral); shipped with Enhanced Keyboard	
PC Convertible	5140-002	April 1986	Unknown	ISA, 8-bit (proprietary)	—	—	Intel 8088	4.77	256 KB	512 KB	two 720K	none	Application bundle	
PC Convertible	5140-022	April 1986	Unknown	ISA, 8-bit (proprietary)	—	—	Intel 8088	4.77	256 KB	512 KB	two 720K	none		
Personal Computer XT Model 286	5162-286	September 1986	October 1987	ISA, 16-bit	8	2	Intel 80286	6	640 KB	640 KB	1.2 MB	20 MB		
Industrial Computer 5531	5531-001	October 1983	Unknown	ISA, 8-bit	8	3	Intel 8088	4.77	128 KB	640 KB	360 KB	10 MB	Industrial version of the IBM PC XT	
Industrial Computer 5531	5531-011	April 1984	Unknown	ISA, 8-bit	8	3	Intel 8088	4.77	256 KB	640 KB	1.2 MB	none	Industrial version of the IBM PC XT	
Industrial Computer 5531	5531-021	May 1985	Unknown	ISA, 8-bit	8	3	Intel 8088	4.77	256 KB	640 KB	1.2 MB	20 MB	Industrial version of the IBM PC XT	
7531 Industrial Computer	7531-041	May 1985	Unknown	ISA, 16-bit	8	3	Intel 80286	6	512 KB	1 MB	Unknown	Unknown	Industrial version of the IBM PC AT, tower form-factor	
7532 Industrial Computer	7532-041	May 1985	Unknown	ISA, 16-bit	8	3	Intel 80286	6	512 KB	1 MB	Unknown	Unknown	Industrial version of the IBM PC AT, 19-inch rack-mountable form factor	
Industrial Computer 7552	7552-040	October 1986	Unknown	ISA, 16-bit MCA, 16-bit (undocumented)	8 (modules, 7 fillable)	3 (as modules)	Intel 80286	10	4 MB	Unknown	none	none	Also known as "Gearbox", rack-mountable ruggedized modular industrial computer, hybrid MCA and ISA with compromised ISA signal lines—notable for introducing the (16-bit) Micro Channel architecture half a year before the announcement of the PS/2 line in April 1987	
Industrial Computer 7552	7552-140	October 1986	Unknown	ISA, 16-bit MCA, 16-bit (undocumented)	8 (modules, 7 fillable)	3 (as modules)	Intel 80286	10	4 MB	Unknown	one 1.44 MB (as a module)	20 MB (as a module, 40 MB as two identical modules)	Also known as "Gearbox", rack-mountable ruggedized modular industrial computer, hybrid MCA and ISA with compromised ISA signal lines—notable for introducing the (16-bit) Micro Channel architecture half a year before the announcement of the PS/2 line in April 1987	

=== Successor lines ===
- Personal System/2 (list of models)
- Industrial System (list of models)
- PCradio (list of models)
- Ambra (list of models)
- PS/note (list of models)
- EduQuest (list of models)
- ThinkPad
- PS/ValuePoint (list of models)
- Aptiva (list of models)
- PC Series (list of models)
- NetVista
- ThinkCentre

== Timeline ==
Timeline of the IBM Personal Computer

Asterisk (*) denotes a model released in Japan only

== See also ==
- Predecessors to the IBM PC:
  - IBM 5100 (1975)
  - IBM 5110 (1978)
  - IBM 5120 (1980)
  - IBM System/23 Datamaster (1981)
- Japan-only IBM PC variants:
  - IBM 5550
  - IBM JX
  - IBM PS/55
  - IBM Palm Top PC 110
- IBM IntelliStation
- List of IBM products
- IBM PC compatible
