= ThinkStation =

Line of professional workstations by Lenovo

- Logo since 2008

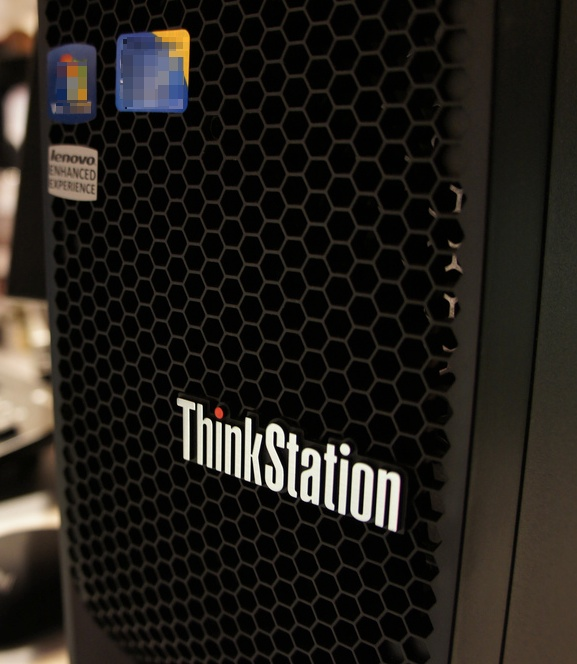
- A ThinkStation C20 with its distinctive front grille
- Developer: Lenovo
- Manufacturer: Lenovo
- Type: Workstation
- Released: November 2007; 18 years ago
- Availability: January 2008; 18 years ago
- Media: Current: USB, Thunderbolt (expansion card required); Previous: Optical drive, IEEE 1394
- Operating system: Microsoft Windows; Ubuntu; Red Hat Enterprise Linux
- CPU: Intel Core, AMD Ryzen PRO Intel Xeon, AMD Threadripper PRO
- Memory: Up to 4 TB ECC memory (DDR3 SDRAM, DDR4 SDRAM, DDR5 SDRAM)
- Storage: Hard disk drive, solid state drive
- Removable storage: Hot-swappable HDDs and SSDs
- Graphics: Nvidia Quadro, Nvidia RTX, AMD Radeon Pro
- Power: Up to 2 redundant 1.85 kW power supply units (PSUs)
- Platform: Think
- Online services: Microsoft 365, Adobe Creative Cloud, Adobe Acrobat
- Marketing target: Business purpose
- Predecessor: IBM IntelliStation
- Related: ThinkPad P series
- Website: Thinkstation P Series | Lenovo US

ThinkStation is a brand of professional workstations from Lenovo announced in November 2007 and then released in January 2008. They are designed to be used for high-end computing and computer-aided design (CAD) tasks and primarily compete with other enterprise workstation lines, such as Dell's Precision, HP's Z line, Acer's Veriton K series, and Apple's Mac Pro line.

== ThinkStation models by year of introduction ==
Market segment (Processor)	Chassis	Release year																	
Market segment (Processor)	Chassis	2008	2009	2010	2011	2012	2013	2014	2015	2016	2017	2018	2019	2020	2021	2022	2023	2024	2025
Low-end (1x Intel Core)	Tower														P348			P2 Gen1	P2 Gen2
Entry-level (1x Intel Core or Xeon 3000/E3-1200/E-2000/W-1000 or AMD Ryzen PRO)	Tower			E20	E30	E31	E32	P300	P310		P320	P330	P330 Gen2	P340	P350	P358; P360	P3 Gen1		P3 Gen2
Entry-level (1x Intel Core or Xeon 3000/E3-1200/E-2000/W-1000 or AMD Ryzen PRO)	(U)SFF					E31	E32	P300	P310		P320	P330	P330 Gen2	P340	P350	P358; P360	P3 Gen1		P3 Gen2
Entry-level (1x Intel Core or Xeon 3000/E3-1200/E-2000/W-1000 or AMD Ryzen PRO)	Tiny										P320	P330	P330 Gen2	P340	P350	P358; P360	P3 Gen1		P3 Gen2
Mid-range (1x Intel Core or Xeon W3000/5000/E5-1600/E5-2600/W-2000)	Tower	S10	S20				S30	P500		P410; P510	P520						P5 Gen1		
Mid-range (1x Intel Core or Xeon W3000/5000/E5-1600/E5-2600/W-2000)	Compact tower										P520c								
High-end (1x Intel Xeon W-3000/AMD Threadripper PRO or 2x Xeon 5000/E5-2600/Scalable)	Tower (Intel)	D10	D20			D30			P700	P710	P720						P7 Gen1		
High-end (1x Intel Xeon W-3000/AMD Threadripper PRO or 2x Xeon 5000/E5-2600/Scalable)	Tower (AMD)													P620				P8 Gen1	
High-end (1x Intel Xeon W-3000/AMD Threadripper PRO or 2x Xeon 5000/E5-2600/Scalable)	Compact			C20; C20x		C30													
Premium/Top (2x Intel Xeon 5000/E5-2600/Scalable)	Tower							P900		P910	P920						PX Gen1		
Premium/Top (2x Intel Xeon 5000/E5-2600/Scalable)	Rack										P920								

== 2024 ==
=== P8 Gen 1 ===
The Lenovo ThinkStation P8 Gen 1 is a high-performance workstation powered by AMD Ryzen Threadripper PRO 7000 WX-Series processors, offering up to 96 cores and 5.3 GHz for unparalleled computing power, ideal for multi-threaded applications like 3D rendering, simulations, and data analysis. Housed in an Aston Martin-inspired 4U chassis with an advanced cooling system, it supports up to 1TB of DDR5 ECC memory, three double-width or six single-width Nvidia GPUs (PCI Express 5.0-ready), and up to 52TB of storage with NVMe and SATA RAID options. It USB-C 3.2 Gen 2, Wi-Fi 6E, and optional 25-Gigabit Ethernet.

=== P2 Gen 1 ===
The ThinkStation P2 is equipped with Intel Core processors, with options up to the Core i9-14900K (Raptor Lake), featuring up to 24 cores for exceptional multitasking and processing power. It supports high-performance tasks with ISV (Independent Software Vendor) certifications for applications from vendors like Adobe, Autodesk, and Dassault Systèmes. It offers support for Nvidia RTX graphics, with configurations up to the Nvidia RTX A2000 (12GB), enabling smooth rendering for graphic-intensive applications and 3D visualization. The system supports up to 128GB of DDR5 RAM, ensuring efficient handling of large datasets and multitasking. Storage options include up to 4TB M.2 PCIe Gen 4 NVMe SSDs and 3.5-inch SATA HDDs (up to 4TB), with support for RAID 0/1/5/10. The P2 Tower includes flexible storage options, such as a 3.5-inch Flex Bay for additional drives, and expansion slots for USB (e.g., 2-Port USB 3.0 or USB 3.2 Gen2x2 Type-C) and serial port adapters. However, its compact design limits the number of PCI cards, M.2 slots, and drive bays compared to larger workstations.

== 2023 ==
=== P3/P5/P7/PX Gen 1 ===
Lenovo launched the P3/P5/P7/PX Gen 1 family of ThinkStation in May 2023. The top-of-the-range, ThinkStation PX (pronounced ThinkStation P10), is powered by two 4th Generation Xeon Scalable 'Sapphire Rapids-SP' processors, with up to 120 cores in total. Additionally, it supports up to four Nvidia RTX 6000 Ada Generation graphics cards, each with 48 GB of GDDR6 memory onboard. The high-end ThinkStation P7 is powered by Intel's Xeon W-3400-series processor with up to 56 cores and up to three Nvidia RTX 6000 Ada Lovelace graphics boards. The mid-range ThinkStation P5 with Intel's Xeon W-2400-series CPU features up to 24 cores as well as up to two Nvidia RTX A6000 Ampere-based graphics cards with 48 GB of GDDR6 memory that can be connected using NVLink. The entry-level ThinkStation P3, which is available in Tiny, USFF, and tower form factors, is powered by 13th generation Intel Core 'Raptor Lake-S' processors and Nvidia Quadro T400 or T1000 Turing-based workstation GPUs. The updated ThinkStations have a baseboard management controller and can be serviced remotely.

== 2022 ==
=== P360 ===
Lenovo launched the ThinkStation P360, the successor of the P350. It is powered by 12th generation Intel Core 'Alder Lake-S' processors and Nvidia professional graphics support & VR-ready option. The model is eco-certified and built with sustainable materials. The prices for the model started at $1,049.00.

== 2021 ==
=== P350 ===
P350 is the successor of model P340, with the 11^{th}-generation of Intel Core or Xeon W-1300 CPUs and PCI Express 4.0.

== 2020 ==
=== P340 ===
P340 is the successor of model P330, with the 10^{th}-generation of Intel Core or Xeon W-1200 CPUs.

== 2019 ==
Lenovo on May 7, 2019 introduced upgraded versions of its ThinkStation P720 and ThinkStation P920 workstations. The new workstations are based on up to two Intel 2nd generation Xeon Scalable Cascade Lake-SP processors featuring up to 28 cores per socket and running at up to 4.4 GHz. The CPUs are paired with up to 384 GB or 2 TB of DDR4-2933 memory on P720 or P920 respectively, as well as multiple Nvidia Quadro RTX 8000 or Quadro GV100 graphics cards. Both machines support several NVMe/PCIe SSDs (either in M.2 form-factor or on a special PCIe 3.0 x16 Quad M.2 adapter) as well as up to 60 TB of HDD capacity.

== 2018 ==
=== P330 ===
Lenovo described the P330, available in three form factors, as "entry-level workstations." As the middle digit of the model number implied, these replacements for the P320 series represented a new generation of architecture and design language. The P330 series was available with 8^{th}-generation Core i5/i7 (Coffee Lake-S) processors, including Xeon E-2100 workstation CPUs.

== 2017 ==
=== P520/P520c ===
Lenovo announced both of the P520 models in November 2017. Both P520/P520c support Intel Xeon W-series processors (e.g., W-2100 or W-2200 series), with options ranging from 4 cores (e.g., W-2102) up to 18 cores (e.g., W-2295, 3.0 GHz base, up to 4.6 GHz turbo, 24.75 MB cache). The main notable differences beside versions are the number of RAM slots (8 slots with maximum of a 256 GB RAM in the P520 vs. 4 slots/128 GB in the P520c) and the case size (P520c is smaller the P520). P520 features five PCIe 3.0 slots (2x PCIe x16, 1x PCIe x8, 2x PCIe x4) plus one PCI slot, offering greater expandability for additional GPUs, storage controllers, or network cards, while P520c has four PCIe 3.0 slots (2x PCIe x16, 1x PCIe x8, 1x PCIe x4), which is more limited.

=== P720/P920 ===
A mid/high-end dual-LGA 3647 socket solution. Official specs:

- Processors: Supports up to two Intel® Xeon® Scalable processors (Gen 1 or Gen 2), including Bronze, Silver, Gold, or Platinum series, with up to 28 cores per CPU.
- RAM: 384 GB / 1 (or 2) TB (LRDIMM/RDIMM) ECC, DDR4-2666 (12 / 16 slots)
- PSU: 850 W / 1400 W proprietary

=== P320 ===
The ThinkStation P320 is available in three distinct form factors: tower, small form factor, and tiny. It supports Intel® Xeon® E3 v5/v6 and Intel® Core™ i3/i5/i7 processors, and up to 64GB DDR4-2400 ECC/non-ECC RAM in Tower and SFF models (4 DIMM slots) or up to 32GB DDR4-2400 non-ECC RAM in Tiny model (2 SO-DIMM slots).

== 2016 ==
=== P510 ===
A high-end single-socket solution. Official specs:

- Processor: Up to Intel Xeon E5-2600 v4 (22*2.2 GHz)
- RAM: Up to 256 GB RDIMM 2400 MHz (8 slots)
- Graphics: 2x PCIe x16 slots, up to Nvidia Quadro P6000 or Tesla K40 in base
- PSU: 490 or 650 W, proprietary

=== P710 ===
A regular dual-socket solution. Official specs:

- Processors: 2x Intel's E5-2600 v4 Broadwell-EP processor family up to 22 cores and 3.6 GHz per socket.
- Memory: DDR4 memory modules (RDIMM) at 2400 MHz. Fully loaded with 32 GB RDIMM modules in all 12 slots (6 DIMMs per processor), 8-channel capable (4-channel per processor), and outfitted with dual processors the system will support up to 384 GB of memory.
- Storage: Up to 12 storage devices, and a maximum storage capacity of 36 TB. A Flex Connector just above the internal storage bays can support a maximum of two optional dual M.2 storage devices using a Flex Adapter. The system features an integrated storage controller operating a 6 Gbit/s but for more RAID options and faster speed, users can install an optional LSI 9364-8iPCIe adapter with 1 GB memory and 12 Gbit/s SAS SATA support.
- Expansion: Support for up to three GPU graphics (three PCIe 3.0 x16 slots, two via CPU1, one via CPU2.) or computational accelerators from Nvidia.
- Power supply: One fixed 650 watts or 850 watts, autosensing, 92%, 80 PLUS Platinum qualified. 650 W: 1x150 W + 2x75 W with onboard SATA controller and up to two 120 W CPU each; 850 W: 1x300 W + 2x75 W (up to two 120 W CPU each), or 2x150W+1x75W.

=== P910 ===
A high-end dual-socket solution. Official specs:

- Processors: 2x Intel Xeon E5-2600 v4
- RAM: 896 GB/512 GB (LRDIMM/RDIMM) ECC, DDR4-2400 (16 slots)
- Graphics:
- PSU: 1300 W proprietary

== 2015 ==
=== P310 ===
Announced at AU 2015, the ThinkStation P310 is an "entry-level" workstation and replacement for the P300. It comes standard with an Intel Xeon E3-1200v5 processor and an Nvidia Quadro K series GPU. It can accommodate up to 64 GB of RAM, and supports Lenovo's FLEX drive system.

=== P700 ===
The P700 was introduced in November 2015. It has simple black case with red accents that includes numerous places on its front for headphones, a card reader, USB ports, etc. The side panel includes a keyed lock and can be removed by depressing a steel lever. All internal components are modular and designed to be removed and replaced without tools. The P700 uses Intel Xeon processors. Nvidia graphics cards come standard.

Specifications:

- Processor: Up to 2 x 18 core E5-2699 v3 2.3/3.6 GHz 45 MB L3 cache
- RAM: Up to 768 GB LRDIMM (384 GB RDIMM) 2133 MHz – 2 x Quad Channel (12 x (64 GB LRDIMM or 32 GB RDIMM))
- Power: 650 W or 850 W

== 2014 ==
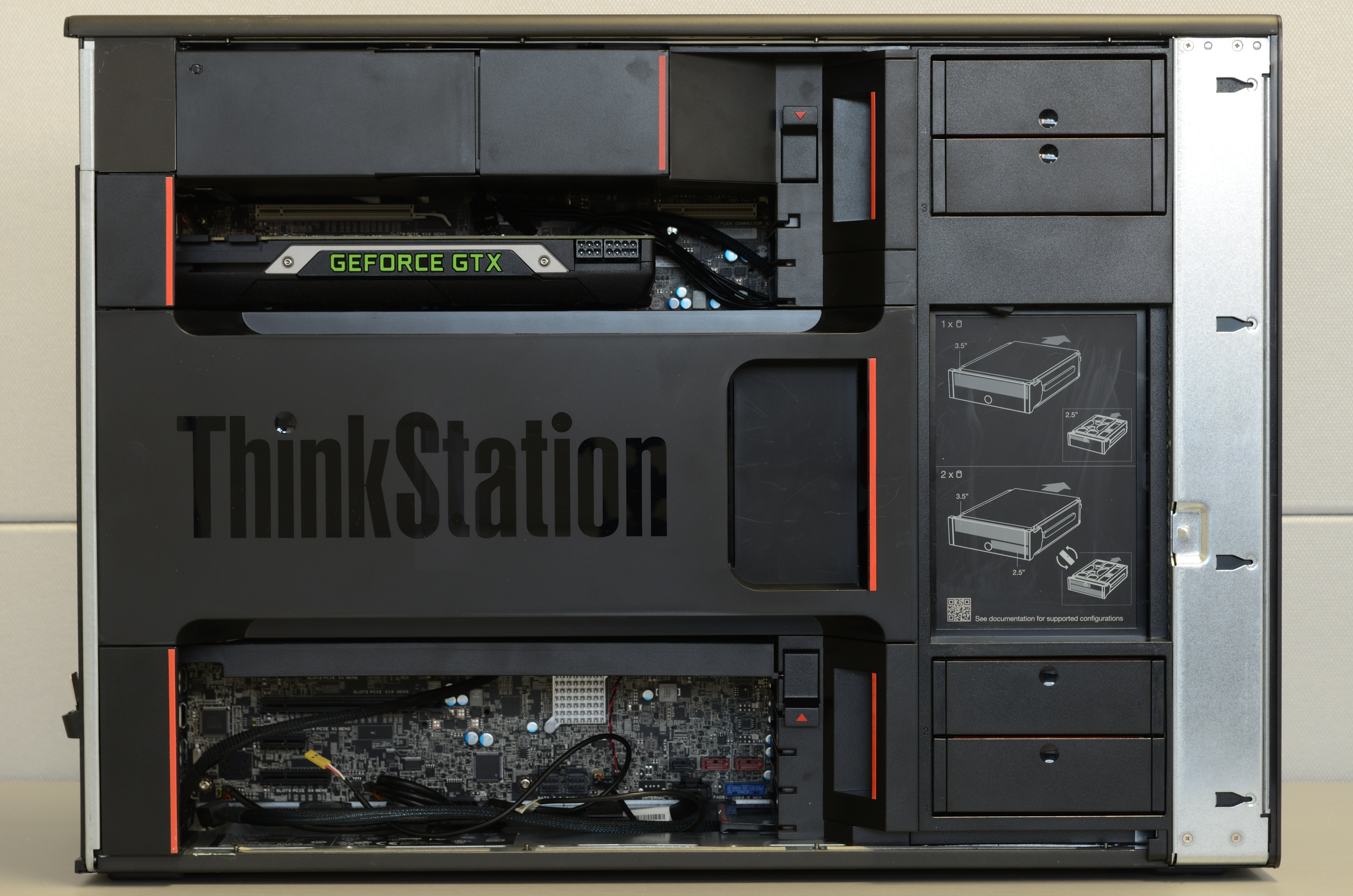
Inside a ThinkStation P900

Lenovo launched the ThinkStation P Series at the Special Interest Group on Computer Graphics and Interactive Techniques (SIGGRAPH) 2014 in Vancouver, Canada. The P Series is designed for use in engineering, architecture, professional video, energy production, finance, and other computationally intensive industries. The series includes the P900, P700, P500, and P300 models. The P Series uses Xeon processors from Intel and Quadro video cards from Nvidia in base. The P300 line uses Haswell-based Xeon E3-1200 v3 CPUs and supports dual channel memory. The P500 uses a single single Haswell-EP Xeon E5-1600 v3 or E5-2600 v3 CPU and quad channel memory. The P700 uses two Haswell-EP Xeon E5-2600 v3 CPUs. The P900 is similar to the P700 but uses multi-PCIe and has enhanced I/O. The P series is ISV-certified for all applications.

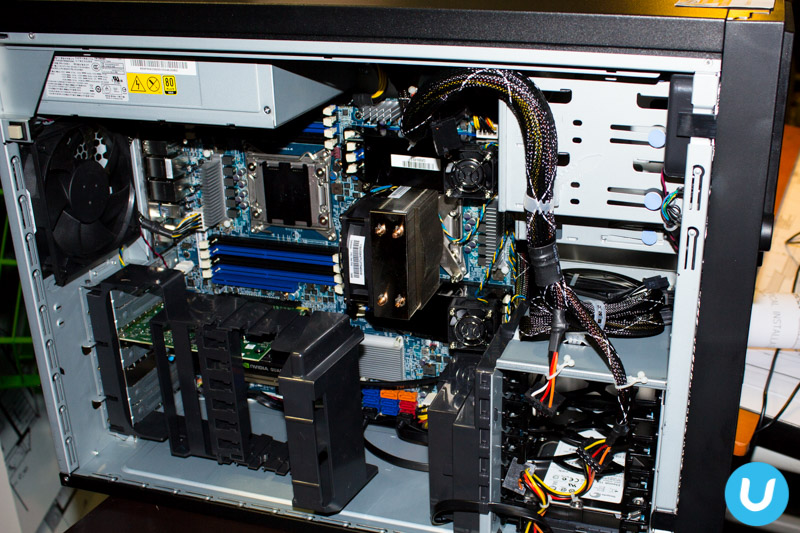
ThinkStation P300 internals

The P Series is based on Lenovo's "Flex" system of trays and connectors that are designed to enable toolless upgrades. The Flex Bay at the front of each unit can be configured with an optical drive or a variety of options such card readers and FireWire connections. Drives are installed using Flex Bays that come in 2.5" and 3.5" sizes. Each tray can handle one 3.5" drive or two 2.5" drives. The Flex Connector is a mezzanine card that links the motherboard via PCIe to SATA, SAS, and RAID devices without using up card slots.

=== P500 ===
A high-end single-socket solution. Official specs:

- Processor: Up to Intel Xeon E5-2699 v3 (18*2.67 GHz)
- RAM: Up to 512/256 GB LRDIMM/RDIMM 2133 MHz (8 slots)
- Graphics: 2x PCIe x16 slots, up to Nvidia Quadro M6000 or Tesla K20
- PSU: 490 or 650 watt, proprietary

== 2013 ==
=== S30 ===
The Lenovo ThinkStation S30 was introduced in 2013. It features Intel Sandy Bridge chipsets and processors and was later upgraded to Intel's Ivy Bridge Xeon processors from four cores (e.g. Intel Xeon E5-1620 v2) up to twelve cores, such as the high-end model Xeon E5-2697 v2.

=== E32 ===
On August 21, 2013, Lenovo introduced the ThinkStation E32 professional workstation that is available in either a tower or 12.9L small form factor chassis. The E32 incorporates the latest Intel Haswell chipset and supports the Intel Xeon E3 and 4th generation processors as well as the Intel Core i7 and Core i5 series processors. The E32 supports both on-board Intel HD Graphics P4600 as well as Nvidia NVS or Quadro 3D graphics cards, up to the K4000. The E32 supports up to 32 GB of 1600 MHz, DDR3 ECC memory in both form factors and has USB 3.0 ports on the front and rear of the chassis for a total of six USB 3.0 ports.

As are all Lenovo ThinkStations, the E32 is fully ISV certified for applications suites from Autodesk, Adobe, Dassault Systèmes, PTC and Siemens, as well as many others. The E32 makes an ideal entry-level platform for CAD and AEC users. Both the tower and SFF configurations are reliable and "green," offering 80 Plus Platinum certification with up to 92% power efficiency. Due to the integration of the Intel Haswell microarchitecture and Microsoft officially ending support for the Windows XP operating system in April 2014, the E32 is the first ThinkStation model that does not support the installation of Windows XP.

== 2012 ==
=== D30 ===
The ThinkStation D30 is a full-sized traditional tower workstation released in 2012. As is typical for ThinkStations, the front panel features a perforated honeycomb shaped pattern. The D30 can hold up to two Intel Xeon eight-core processors that feature hyperthreading in order to support the processing of up to 32 simultaneous streams of data. Video is powered by Nvidia Quadro graphics cards. The D30 scored a very high 25.31 points on the Cinebench test of 3D rendering. For comparison, the late 2012 Apple Mac Pro only scored 7.36 points on the same test.

In a review of the D30 PC Magazine wrote, "Sometimes, you just need to bring out the big stick, and the Lenovo ThinkStation D30 is that big stick. The sheer power of the dual eight-core Xeon CPUs plus the ability to add on more powerful Nvidia Quadro cards means that this is a system to scorch project deadlines in minutes rather than hours, or hours instead of days. Our last dual-processor workstation Editors' Choice was the Lenovo ThinkStation C20, which amazed us by putting dual Xeon CPUs in a more compact chassis. The Lenovo ThinkStation D30 now usurps that mantle, as the dual-processor workstation Editors' Choice. It wins with power, expandability, and a ruthless devotion to get your project done before any of your rivals can."

=== C30 ===
The ThinkStation C30 is a high-end dual-processor workstation designed for use in video editing, engineering, and finance. The C30 is slightly smaller than a full-sized tower but still comes with two PCI slots, two free PCIe x16 card slots for graphics cards, a free PCIe x4 slot, and space for two free hard drive bays. Two Intel Xeon E5-2620 processors, up-to 256 GB of ECC DDR3 system memory (2x4 slots), an Nvidia Quadro 4000 graphics card, and a 500 GB hard drive come standard. There is an option to rack mount the C30.

PC Magazine wrote, "The Lenovo ThinkStation C30 is a very good dual-processor workstation. It is a powerhouse for the space constrained financial, DCC, or engineering user in your organization. The system therefore comes highly recommended, but its roomier, more powerful, and more expensive big brother the Lenovo ThinkStation D30 holds on to the Editors' Choice for dual-processor workstations for the time being for having a lot more power and being more flexible for future upgrades."

== 2011 ==
=== E30 ===
Announced in March 2011, the E30 workstation could be equipped with either Intel Core i3/i5/i7 or Intel Xeon E3-1200 processors. The workstation could be equipped with either 80 GB or 160 GB solid state drives. Discrete graphics were available on the workstation, in the form of Nvidia Quadro or NVS graphics.

When the E30 was launched, Tao Gu, the executive director and general manager of Lenovo's Workstation Business Unit said, "We created the ThinkStation E30 workstation to offer extremely powerful processing on a software-certified solution at desktop prices."

Detailed specifications of the workstation are as follows:

- Processor: 2nd generation Core (up to i7-2600) or Xeon E3-1200 (up to E3-1245 or E3-1270)
- RAM: up to 32 GB DDR3-1333 ECC (4 slots)
- Integrated graphics:
  - Intel HD 2000
  - Intel HD 3000 (some Core models)
  - Intel HD P3000 (Xeon E3-12x5 only)
  - None (Xeon E3-12x0 only)
- Discrete 2D graphics: up to Nvidia Quadro NVS 450 (512 MB DDR3)
- Discrete 3D graphics: up to Nvidia Quadro 600 (1 GB DDR3) or Nvidia Quadro 2000 (1 GB GDDR5)
- Storage:
  - Up to 2 TB 7200 RPM SATA
  - Up to 600 GB 10,000 RPM SATA
  - Up to 160 GB SSD
- Dimensions (mm): 412 x 175 x 420
- Weight: 31 pounds (14 kg)

== 2010 ==
=== C20 ===
The C20 workstation was compact, designed to be easy to mount on a rack. This compact size allowed up to 14 workstations to be stacked in a standard 42U rack. It also meant that users who used a single workstation were offered extra space either on or beneath their desk.

Detailed specifications of the workstation are as follows:

- Processor: 2x Xeon 5600
- Chipset: Intel 5520
- RAM: Up to 48 GB DDR3 1066 MHz (6 slots)
- Graphics: 2x PCI Express 2.0 x16
  - Up to 2x Nvidia Quadro FX 4800
- Storage: Up to 3x 500 GB SATA
- Operating System: Windows 7 Professional (64-bit)
- Optical Drive: One 5.25" bay, with DVD- or Blu-ray reader/writer

SLASHGEAR stated that they "had trouble slowing the C20 down – this isn’t a PC where opening a few dozen browser windows will cause lag – and it stayed admirably quiet too (though fan noise did ramp up as the system was stressed during benchmark testing)". The reviewer also stated that the price would be far too high for most people to afford.

The reviewer summed up the workstation by saying, "Graphics professionals, video editors or anyone looking to do vast amounts of crunching in minimal amounts of time, however – and without turning their office into a server farm – should definitely be considering the C20."

In addition, since the machine was designed as a workstation used by graphic professionals and video editors it was not intended to replace high end gaming machines.

PCMag received the workstation positively, awarding it 4 out of 5 stars as well as an Editors' Choice award.

The workstation has been certified by several ISVs, including:

- Autodesk: 3ds Max (2008/2009), Alias Studio 2008, AutoCad 2008, Maya (2008 Extension 2/2009/2010), Softimage 2010
- Dassault Systèmes: Catia (V5R18/V5R19/V6R2009x), SolidWorks
- PTC: CoCreate Modeling, Pro/E Wildfire 4.0, Pro/E Wildfire 5.0
- Siemens: NX 4, NX 5

=== E20 ===
The E20 workstation was called ‘a "real" workstation for the price of a consumer PC’ by PCMag. It received the "Honorable Mention" award in PCMag's "Best of the Year" 2010 awards. The workstation also included several environmentally friendly features. Among these were Energy Star 5.0 and GREENGUARD certifications. The workstation incorporated 66% recycled plastics, with several recycling programs available from Lenovo once the workstation reached end-of-life.

Desktop Review received the workstation positively saying, "Quiet, capable and offering excellent build quality, the ThinkStation E20 is a good option for those in need of a workstation's benefits in a slimmer, more efficient package." The workstation was awarded 4 out of 5 stars by Desktop Review.

Detailed specifications of the workstation are as follows:

- Processor: 1st generation dual-core Core i3/i5 or Xeon quad-core 3400 (up to X3470)
- Memory: Up to 16 GB DDR3 ECC memory
- Storage: Up to 500 GB SATA
- Graphics: Up to Nvidia Quadro FX 1800 or Quadro 2000
- Optical Drive: Dual-Layer DVD+/-RW
- Operating System: Microsoft Windows 7 Professional

The workstation has received certifications from several ISVs, including:

- Autodesk: AutoCad (2009-2011)
- Dassault Systèmes: Catia V5, SolidWorks (2009-2011)

== 2009 ==
=== S20 ===
The S20 workstation was released by Lenovo in 2009 and had significant expansion options. The workstation included a PCI, PCIe x1, and two PCIe x16 slots. The workstation also included space for a second optical drive, and two additional 3.5 inch hard disk drive bays. There were also 10 USB ports and 1 eSATA port. However, there was no standard Firewire port. The S20 workstation also included several environmentally friendly certifications including EPEAT Gold, RoHS, Energy Star 5.0 and GREENGUARD.

Detailed specifications of the workstation are given below:

- Processor: Xeon W3500/5500 (2009 models) or W3600/5600 (2010 models)
- Chipset: Intel X58
- Memory: DDR3-1333 ECC, up to 24 GB (6 slots)
- Storage: Up to three 500 GB 7200 RPM SATA (in RAID 0 array)
- Graphics: 2x PCI Express 2.0 x16
  - Up to Nvidia Quadro FX 4800 or Quadro 4000
  - Up to ATI FirePro V7750
- Optical Drive: Dual-Layer DVD reader/writer
- Operating System: Microsoft Windows Vista Business

The S20, like other workstations in the ThinkStation product line, has been certified by multiple ISVs, including:

- Autodesk: 3ds Max (2008/2009), AutoCAD 2008, Inventor (2008/2009), Maya (2008 Extension 2/2009/2010), Softimage 2010
- Dassault Systèmes: Catia (V5R18/V5R19/V6R2009x), SolidWorks (2007/2008/2009/2010)
- Siemens: NX 4, NX 5

=== D20 ===
Also released in 2009 along with the S20, the D20 workstation was reported by Desktop Engineering as bearing a strong resemblance to the S20, although it was noticeably larger. According to Desktop Engineering, the D20 workstation delivered very high scores on their benchmark tests, both for Windows XP and Windows Vista. Despite the presence of several fans, the workstation was reported to be nearly silent after the initial boot.

Detailed specifications for the workstation are as follows:

- Processors: 2x Xeon 5500 (2009 models) or 5600 (2010 models)
- Chipset: Intel 5520
- Memory: DDR3-1333 ECC up to 96 GB (UDIMM) or 192 GB (RDIMM) (12 slots)
- Graphics: 2x PCI Express 2.0 x16
  - Up to 2x Nvidia Quadro FX 5800 or 5000
- Storage: Up to five 500 GB 7200 RPM SATA (in RAID 0 array)
- Optical Drive: 16x dual-layer DVD reader/writer

== 2008 ==
=== S10 ===
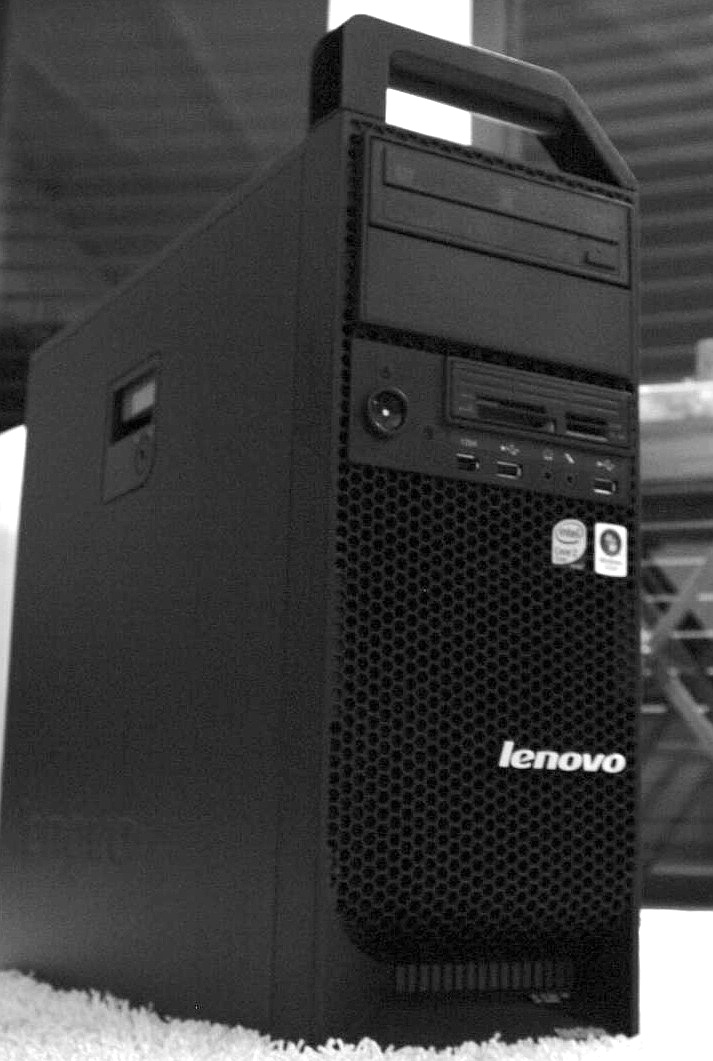
The Lenovo ThinkStation S10

In its review of the S10, Trusted Reviews indicated that the workstation used a consumer chipset – while also saying, "Looking at the available specifications, there's nothing to raise suspicion that these machines may underperform."

Detailed specifications of the workstation are as follows:

- Processor: Up to Intel Core 2 Extreme QX6850
- Chipset: Intel X38
- Memory: Up to 8 GB DDR3-1066 ECC (4 slots)
- Graphics: 2x PCIe x16, 1x PCIe x4.
  - Nvidia Quadro NVS 290 (256 MB VRAM)
  - Nvidia Quadro FX 370 (256 MB VRAM)
  - Nvidia Quadro FX 1700 (512 MB VRAM)
  - Nvidia Quadro FX 4600 (768 MB VRAM)
- Storage: up to 3 hard drives
  - SATA 7,200 RPM: Up to 750 GB
  - SAS 15,000 RPM: Up to 300 GB
- Optical Drive: Two 5.25" bays, DVD or Blu-ray Burner
- Form Factor: mid-tower
- Dimensions (mm): 426 x 175 x 483
- Power supply: 650 Watt, ATX

=== D10 ===
For the D10 workstation, Lenovo incorporated server grade chipset and processors, as opposed to the S10. The Intel 5400a chipset used in the workstation supported two Intel Xeon processors and 64 GB of DDR2 ECC RAM. The size of the workstation's motherboard necessitated a larger case to accommodate it. However, the increase in size offered additional drive bays. The case could also be mounted on a rack. The detailed specifications of the D10 workstation are as follows:

- Processors: 2x Xeon 5300 or 5400 (up to X5460)
- Chipset: Intel 5400a
- RAM: up to 64 GB DDR2-667 ECC FB-DIMM (8 slots)
- Graphics: 2x PCIe 2.0 x16
  - Nvidia Quadro NVS 290 (256 MB VRAM)
  - Nvidia Quadro FX 370 (256 MB VRAM)
  - Nvidia Quadro FX 1700 (512 MB VRAM)
  - Nvidia Quadro FX 4600 (768 MB VRAM)
- Storage: up to 5 hard drives
  - SATA 7,200 RPM: Up to 750 GB
  - SAS 15,000 RPM: Up to 300 GB
- Optical Drive: Three 5.25" bays, DVD or Blu-ray Burner
- Form Factor: Tower
- Dimensions (mm): 434 x 210 x 602
- Power supply: 1000 Watt, proprietary

== See also ==
- ThinkPad P series
- IBM IntelliStation
- Dell Precision
- Mac Pro
- Fujitsu Celsius
- HP Z

Preceded by IBM IntelliStation	Lenovo ThinkStation; 2008-current
