= IBM PS/ValuePoint =

Personal computer

PS/ValuePoint

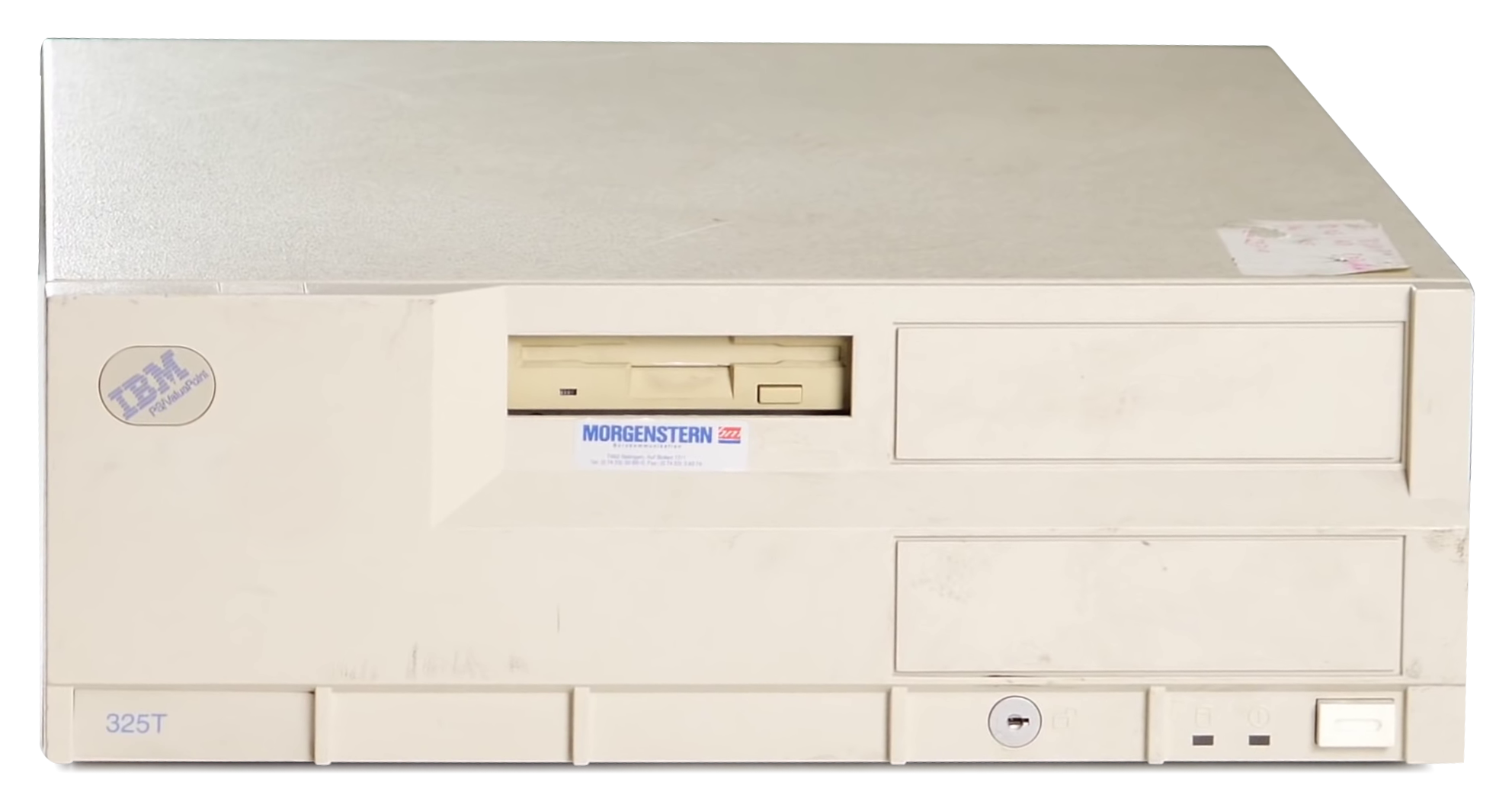
- PS/ValuePoint 325T
- Also known as: ValuePoint
- Developer: IBM
- Type: Desktop computer
- Released: October 1992
- Discontinued: July 1995
- CPU: x86
- Predecessor: IBM PS/2
- Successor: IBM PC Series
- Related: IBM Ambra IBM Aptiva

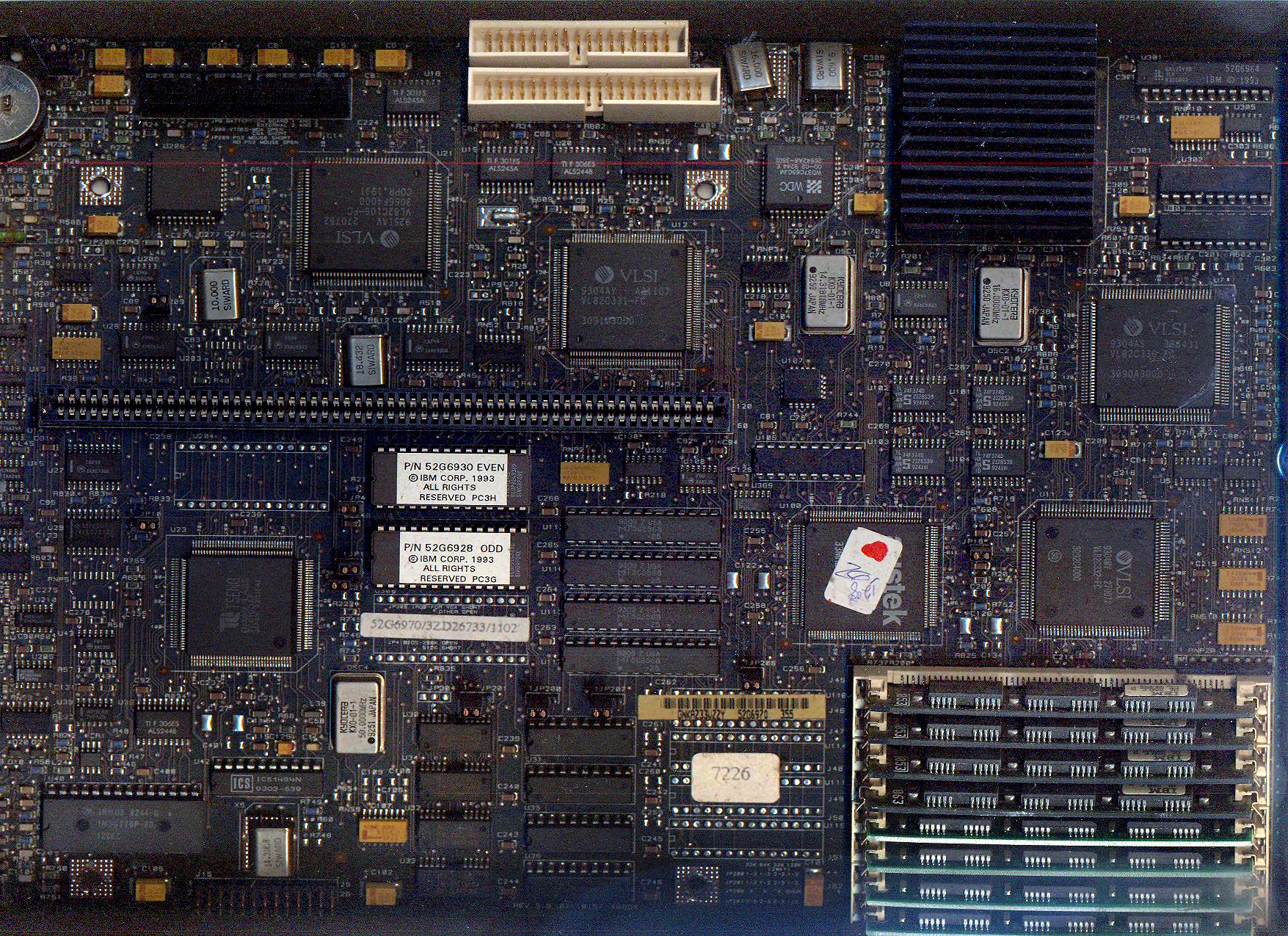
Motherboard of a model with an Intel i486SX microprocessor, with an elongated connector (black, horizontally in the middle/left between upper and lower edge) for a riser card on which the ISA bus slots were located

The PS/ValuePoint (or just ValuePoint) personal computer was IBM's answer to the PC clone market, where the IBM PS/2 could not compete due to price and proprietary interfaces. Announced in October 1992 and withdrawn in July 1995, it was replaced by the IBM PC Series 300.

== Specifications and history ==
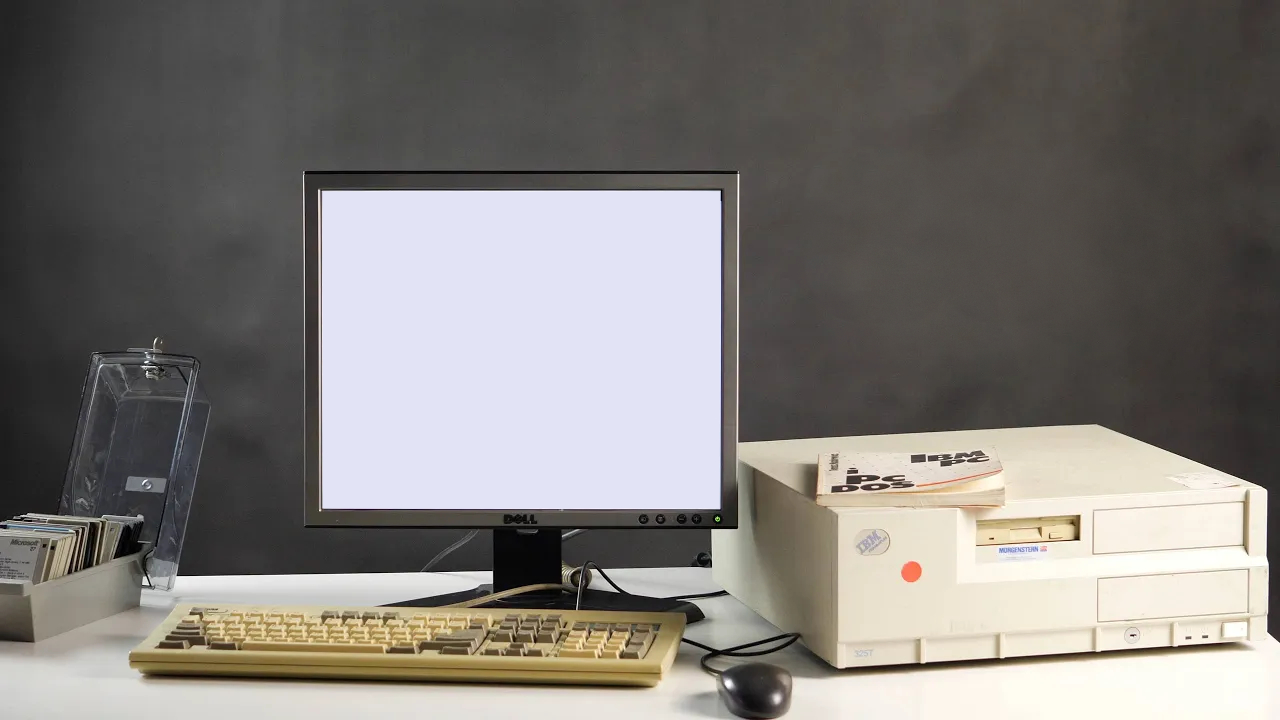
PS/ValuePoint 325T in use

These systems used standard Industry Standard Architecture (ISA) bus, SVGA graphics and IDE hard disks. Later models introduced VESA Local Bus and PCI.

Processors range from the 386SLC-25, 486SX-25, 486DX-33, and 486DX2-66 to the Pentium 60.

IBM PS/ValuePoints were shipped in the following form factors:

- Space saving desktop introductory: IBM 6381 model #: /Si (3 expansion card slots & 3 drive bays)
- Space saving desktop: IBM 6382 model #: /S (3 expansion card slots & 3 drive bays)
- Desktop: IBM 6384 model #: /D (5 expansion card slots & 5 drive bays)
- Mini Tower: IBM 8387 model #: /T (8 expansion slots & 6 drive bays)

=== Predecessor ===
The IBM PS/ValuePoint series was preceded by these series:

- IBM PS/1
- IBM PS/2

=== Internal concurrents ===
The IBM PS/ValuePoint series was sold concurrently with these series:

- IBM Aptiva and official Aptiva clones by AMBRA Computer Corporation

=== Successor ===
The IBM PS/ValuePoint series was succeeded by these series:

- IBM PC Series

== Models ==
=== Main line ===
Model	Form factor	Processor	Clock speed	Maximum memory	Graphics chipset	Video memory	Bus architecture
325T; 325T/S	Small desktop	IBM 386SLC	25	16 MB	Cirrus Logic CL5422	1 MB	ISA
425SX	Desktop	Intel 486SX	25	32 MB	Tseng Labs ET4000	1 MB	ISA
433DX	Desktop	Intel 486DX	33	32 MB	Tseng Labs ET4000	1 MB	ISA
466DX2	Desktop	Intel 486DX2	66	32 MB	Tseng Labs ET4000	1 MB	ISA
425SX/S; 425SX/D	Small desktop (425SX/S); Desktop (425SX/D)	Intel 486SX	25	64 MB	S3 86C805	1 MB (expandable to 2 MB)	ISA/VESA Local
433SX/S; 433SX/D	Small desktop (433SX/S); Desktop (433SX/D)	Intel 486SX	33	64 MB	S3 86C805	1 MB (expandable to 2 MB)	ISA/VESA local
433DX/S; 433DX/D; 433DX/T	Small desktop (433DX/S); Desktop (433DX/D); Tower (433DX/T)	Intel 486DX	33	64 MB	S3 86C805	1 MB (expandable to 2 MB)	ISA/VESA local
466DX2/D; 466DX2/T	Desktop (466DX2/D); Tower (466DX2/T)	Intel 486DX2	66	64 MB	S3 86C805	1 MB (expandable to 2 MB)	ISA/VESA Local
P60/D	Desktop	Intel Pentium	60	128 MB	ATI 68800AX	1 MB (expandable to 2 MB)	ISA/PCI

=== Performance line ===
Model	Form factor	Processor	Clock speed	Maximum memory	Graphics chipset	Video memory	Bus architecture
433SX/Sp; 433SX/Dp	Small desktop (433SX/Sp); Desktop (433SX/Dp)	Intel 486DX	33	128 MB	S3 Vision864	1 MB (expandable to 2 MB)	ISA/VESA Local
433DX/Sp; 433DX/Dp	Small desktop (433DX/Sp); Desktop (433DX/Dp)	Intel 486DX	33	128 MB	S3 Vision864	1 MB (expandable to 2 MB)	ISA/VESA local
450DX2/Sp; 450DX2/Dp	Small desktop (450DX2/Sp); Desktop (450DX2/Dp)	Intel 486DX2	50	128 MB	S3 Vision864	1 MB (expandable to 2 MB)	ISA/VESA Local
466DX2/Sp; 466DX2/Dp; 466DX2/Tp	Small desktop (466DX2/Sp); Desktop (466DX2/Dp); Tower (466DX2/Tp)	Intel 486DX2	66	128 MB	S3 Vision864	1 MB (expandable to 2MB)	ISA/VESA Local bus or ISA/PCI architecture
100DX4/Sp; 100DX4/Tp	Small desktop (100DX4/Sp); Tower (100DX4/Tp)	Intel 486DX4	100	128 MB	S3 Vision864	1 MB (expandable to 2 MB)	ISA/VESA local bus or ISA/PCI architecture

=== Budget line ===
Model	Form factor	Processor	Clock speed	Maximum memory	Graphics chipset	Video memory	Bus architecture
425SX/Si	Small desktop	Intel 486SX	25	64 MB	Cirrus Logic GD5428	512 KB (expandable to 1 MB)	ISA/VESA local
433SX/Si	Small desktop	Intel 486SX	33	64 MB	Cirrus Logic GD5428	512 KB (expandable to 1 MB)	ISA/VESA local
433DX/Si	Small desktop	Intel 486DX	33	64 MB	Tseng Labs ET4000/W32	512 KB (expandable to 1 MB)	ISA/VESA local
466DX2/Si	Small desktop	Intel 486DX2	66	64 MB	Tseng Labs ET4000/W32	512 KB (expandable to 1 MB)	ISA/VESA local

== Monitor ==
The PS/ValuePoint was shipped with the following monitors:

- PS/2 8511, color (S)VGA (shipped with 325T)
- 6312, color (S)VGA
- 6314, color (S)VGA
- 6317, color (S)VGA
- 6319, color (S)VGA

== Timeline ==
Timeline of the IBM Personal Computer

Asterisk (*) denotes a model released in Japan only
