= IBM NetVista =

IBM brand

NetVista

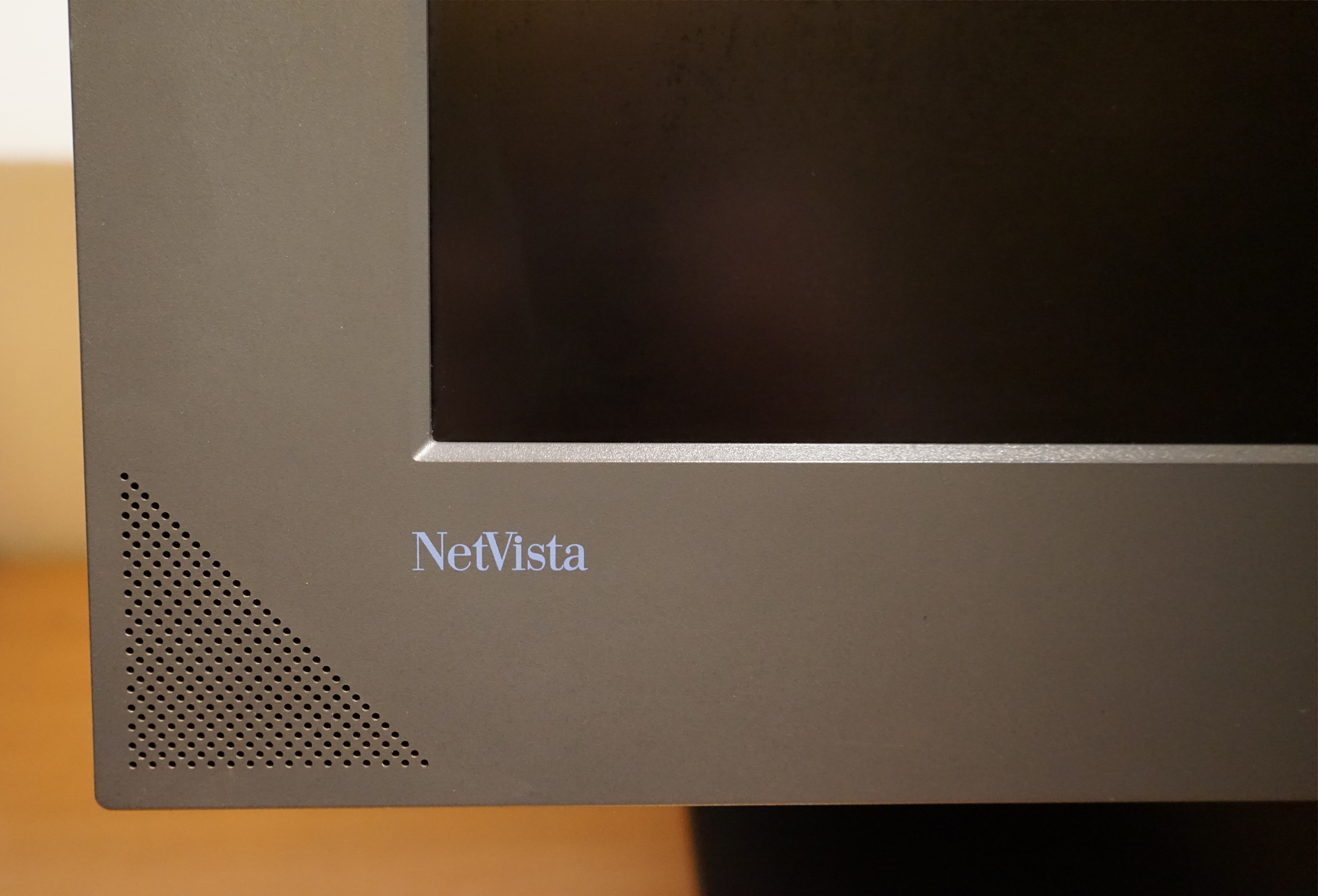
- Closeup of the NetVista X41 all-in-one PC
- Developer: IBM
- Type: Software suite; Thin client; Kiosk; Computer appliance; Desktop/All-in-One
- Released: April 1996 (suite); April 2000 (Thin client); May 2000 (desktops)
- Discontinued: January 2000 (suite); April 2002 (Thin client); May 2004 (desktops)
- Predecessor: IBM Network Station (thin clients); IBM PC Series (desktops)
- Successor: IBM ThinkCentre (desktops)
- Related: IBM Netfinity x86 servers

NetVista is an umbrella name for a variety of products manufactured by IBM.

== Software suite ==
The IBM NetVista Software Suite was introduced in April 1996 as a client–server software suite, with the server software running on OS/2, and the client software on Windows 3.1 and Windows 95. Meant to provide Internet access to K-12 users, it included such things as a web browser, nanny software and other internet utilities, including a TCP/IP stack.

Starting with version 1.1, the server side was also supported on Windows NT. The software suite was withdrawn without replacement in January 2000.

Products:

- NetVista V1.0
- NetVista V1.1
- NetVista V2.0

== Network station ==
In April 2000, the IBM Network Station product line was renamed to IBM NetVista, as were the associated software tools. The NetVista computers were thin client systems. The line was withdrawn in April 2002 with no replacement.

Hardware products:

- NetVista N2200 (Cyrix MediaGX at 233 MHz, 32-288 MB RAM, CompactFlash, Ethernet, USB 1.1, VGA, Audio I/O)
- NetVista N2200e
- NetVista N2200i
- NetVista N2200w
- NetVista N2800
- NetVista N2800e
- NetVista N70

Software products:

- NetVista Thin Client Manager V2R1

== Kiosk ==
Hardware products:

- NetVista Kiosk Model 120
- NetVista Kiosk Model 150

== Appliance ==
This appliance is meant to allow internet access on a TV. It was not sold directly to end-users, but rather as an OEM product to internet providers.

Hardware products:

- NetVista Internet Appliance i30

== Personal computer ==
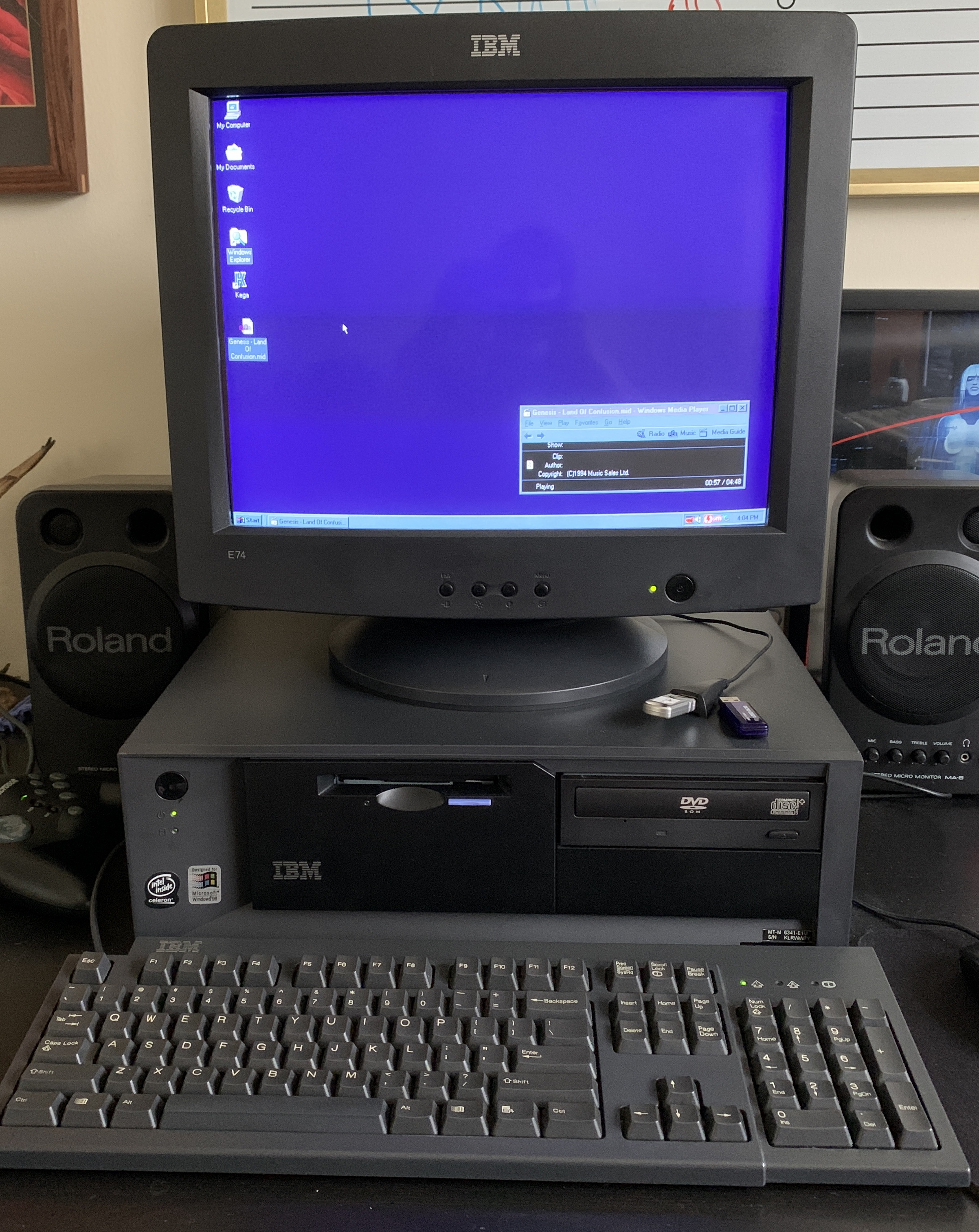
IBM NetVista A22

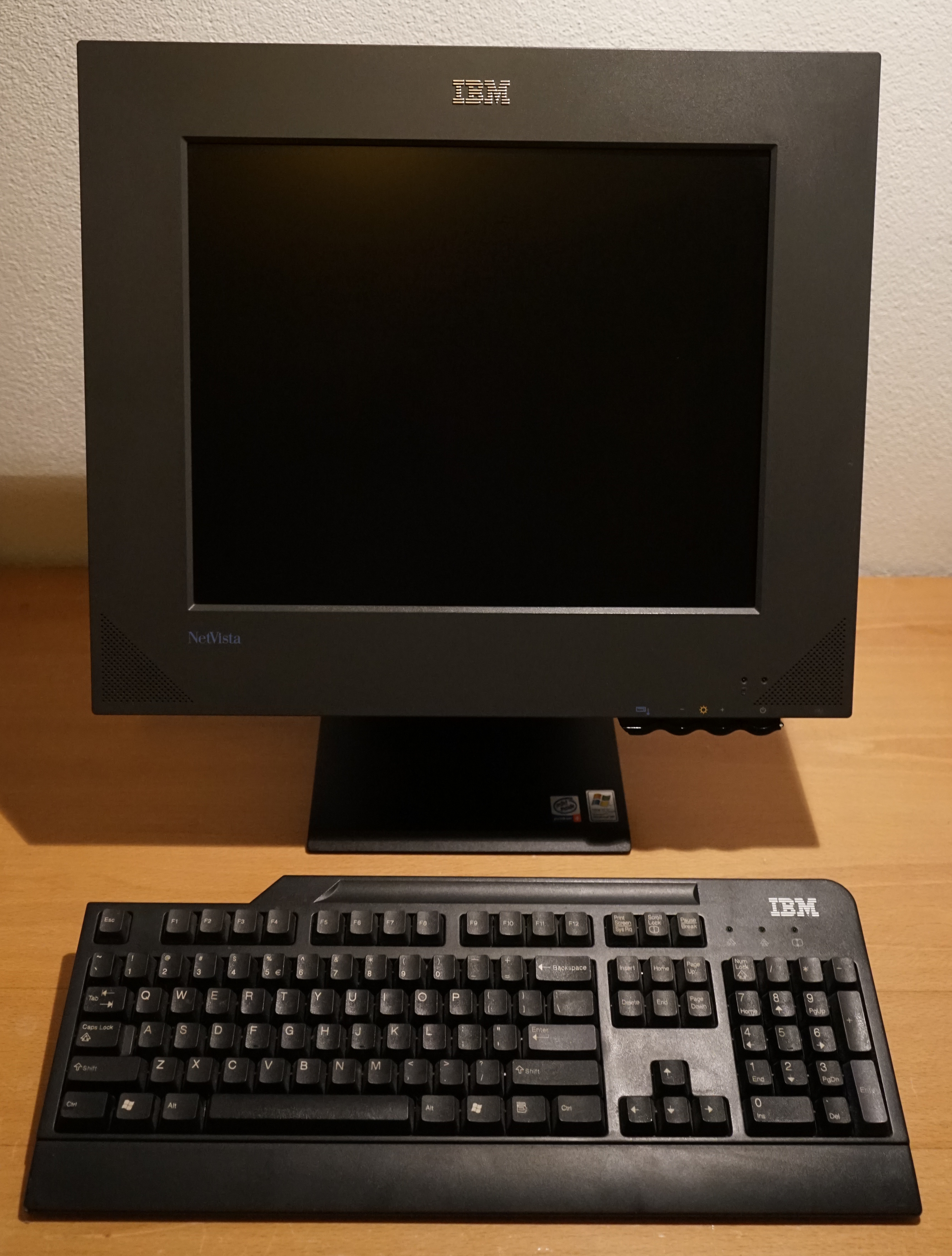
IBM NetVista X41 all-in-one

The IBM NetVista line of personal computers was the follow-up to the IBM PC Series. It was announced in May 2000 alongside the ThinkPad T and A series, and was withdrawn in May 2004 in favor of the ThinkCentre.

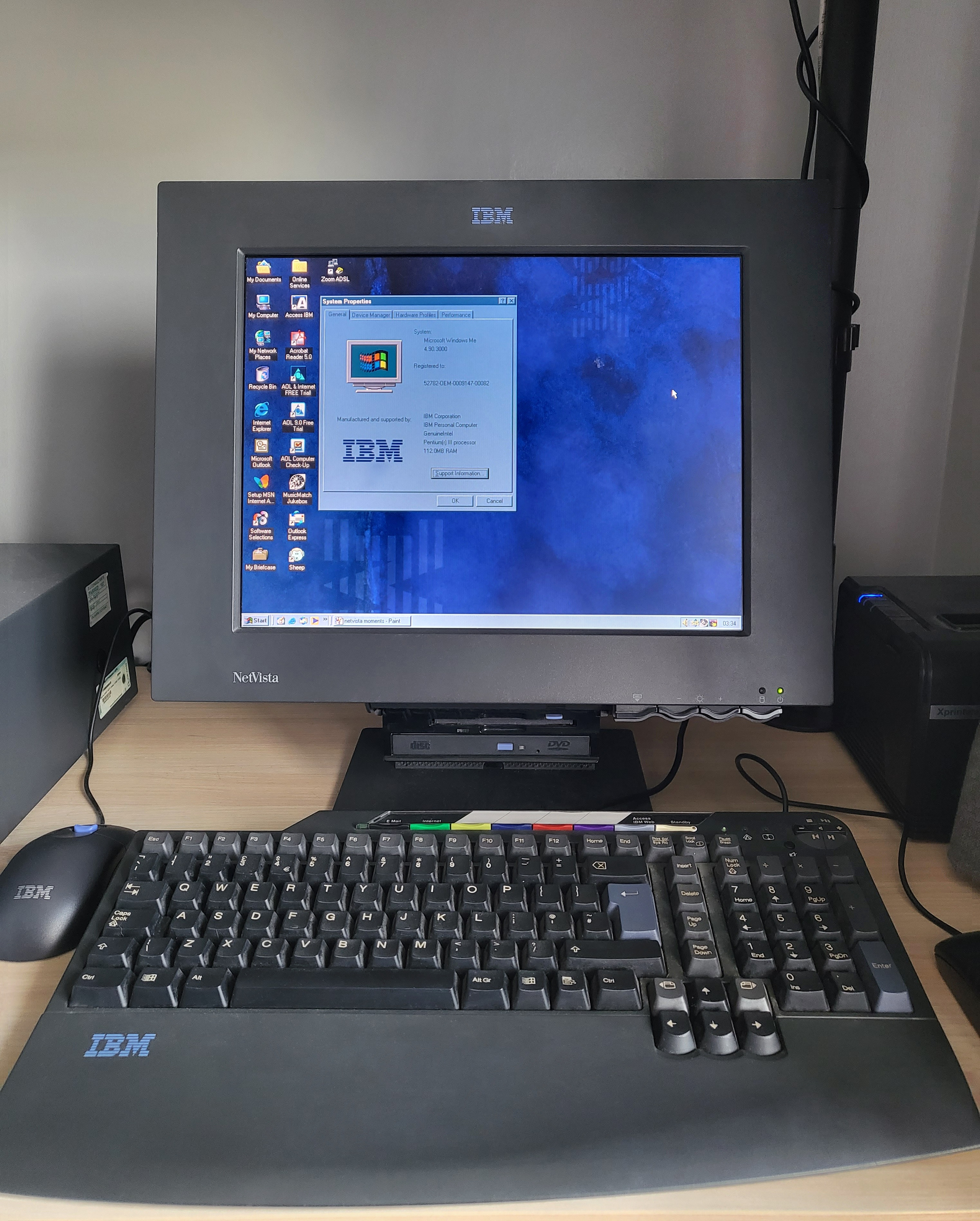
IBM NetVista X40i

Earlier NetVista models used the same beige/white colors for the cases much like the previous IBM PC Series and the related IBM Aptiva, however starting with the NetVista A21 models in 2001, the case colors changed to black, using a similar color found in its contemporary ThinkPad models. These black-colored cases then spread out into other models over time (including its successor, the ThinkCentre) and would last for several years, becoming a signature design element for its computers.

Products:

- A Series
  - IBM NetVista A10
  - IBM NetVista A20 (Pentium III)
  - IBM NetVista A20i (Pentium III)
  - IBM NetVista A21 (Celeron)
  - IBM NetVista A21i (Pentium III)
  - IBM NetVista A22 (Celeron)
  - IBM NetVista A22p (Pentium 4)
  - IBM NetVista A30 (Pentium 4)
  - IBM NetVista A30p (Pentium 4)
  - IBM NetVista A40 (Pentium III)
  - IBM NetVista A40i (AMD Athlon)
  - IBM NetVista A40p (Pentium III)
  - IBM NetVista A60 (Pentium 4)
  - IBM NetVista A60i (Pentium 4)
- M Series (Manageability)
  - IBM NetVista M41
  - IBM NetVista M42
- S Series
  - IBM NetVista S40
  - IBM NetVista S40p
  - IBM NetVista S42
- X Series (all-in-one)
  - IBM NetVista X40
  - IBM NetVista X40i
  - IBM NetVista X41 - designed by Richard Sapper

== Timeline ==
Timeline of the IBM Personal Computer

Asterisk (*) denotes a model released in Japan only
