= IBM PC Series =

Personal computer series released in 1994

Personal Computer Series

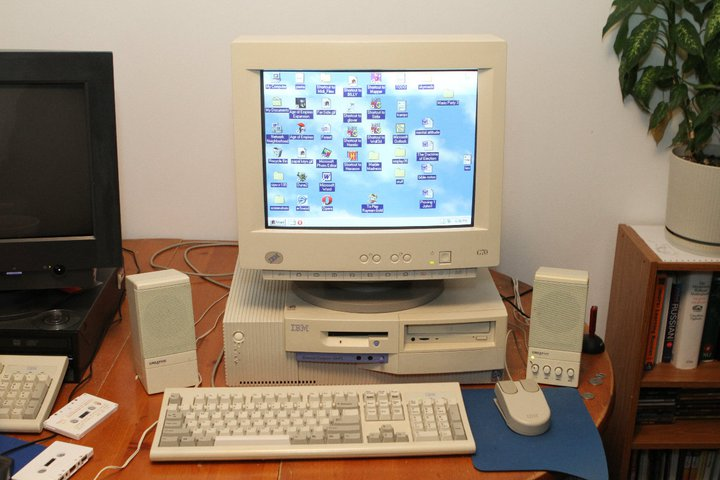
- IBM PC 300PL
- Also known as: PC Series
- Developer: IBM
- Type: Desktop PC
- Released: October 1994
- Discontinued: October 2000
- CPU: x86 or PowerPC (Power series)
- Predecessor: IBM PS/2; IBM PS/ValuePoint
- Successor: IBM NetVista
- Related: IBM Aptiva

The Personal Computer Series, or PC Series, was IBM's follow-up to the Personal System/2 and PS/ValuePoint. Announced in October 1994 and withdrawn in October 2000, it was replaced by the IBM NetVista, apart from the Pentium Pro-based PC360 and PC365, which were replaced by the IBM IntelliStation. The PC series was more business-oriented than the Aptiva line.

== Models ==
=== x86-based ===
==== PC 100 ====
The PC 100 was a budget model, available only in selected markets.

==== PC 140 ====
The PC 140 was a budget model, available only in selected markets.

==== PC Series 300 ====
Industry standard ISA/PCI architecture, first IBM machines with USB. Processors ranged from the 486DX2-50, 486SX-25, 486DX4-100 to the Pentium 200 and in case of the Models 360 and 365 the Pentium Pro. 486 models had a selectable bus architecture (SelectaBus) through a replaceable riser card, offering the choice of either VESA Local Bus/ISA or PCI/ISA. Within the 300 series the following models appeared:

===== PC 330 =====
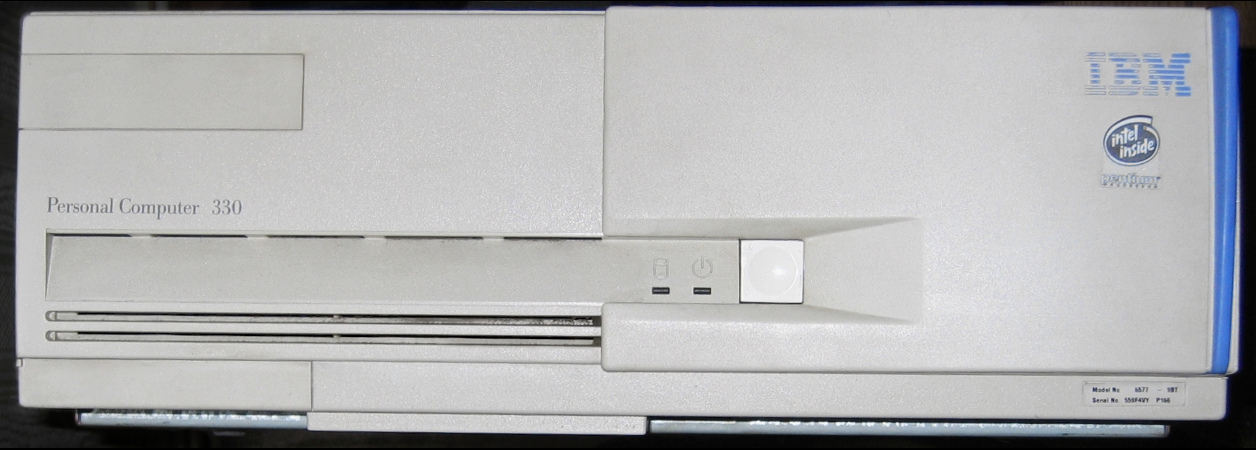
An IBM Personal Computer 330 (6577-9BT)

Its last sub-model used the Pentium P54C processor clocked at 100, 133, 166, or 200 MHz. It had, depending on the sub-model, up to 4 ISA and/or 3 PCI expansion slots and four (2 external 5.25", 1 external and 1 internal 3.5") drive bays. It had in its latest version, the 6577, one DIMM-168 and 4 SIMM-72 memory slots, and featured an IBM SurePath BIOS. This PC has 2 USB 1.0 slots in the back. The latest version of Windows which can be installed on this PC is Windows XP, though Windows 2000 and Windows ME are optimal choices.

The DIMM-168 memory slot takes 5V EDO DRAM and is incompatible with the more commonly used 3.3V SDRAM. The slot looks the same at first glance, but the keying is different. Trying to force a 3.3V SDRAM module into the slot could damage both it and the memory module.

Submodels were:

PC 330 submodels
Name	Model	CPU	MHz	Remarks
Personal Computer 330	Model 6571-Kxx, Lxx, Wxx	Intel 486	25-100	OPTi chipset; shipped with ISA/VLB raiser card
Personal Computer 330	Model 6573-Kxx, Lxx, Wxx	Intel i486	25-100	OPTi chipset; shipped with ISA/PCI raiser card
Personal Computer 330	Model 6575-1xx	Intel Pentium P5	60-66	Up to 133 MHz using the Pentium OverDrive
Personal Computer 330	Model 6576-3xx, 4xx, 5xx, 7xx, 9xx	Intel Pentium P54C	75-100	Up to 200 MHz using the Pentium OverDrive
Personal Computer 330	Model 6577-5xx, 7xx, 9xx, Gxx, Kxx, Lxx	Intel Pentium P54C	75-166	Up to 233 MHz using the Pentium MMX 233 with 75 MHz settings

===== PC 340 =====
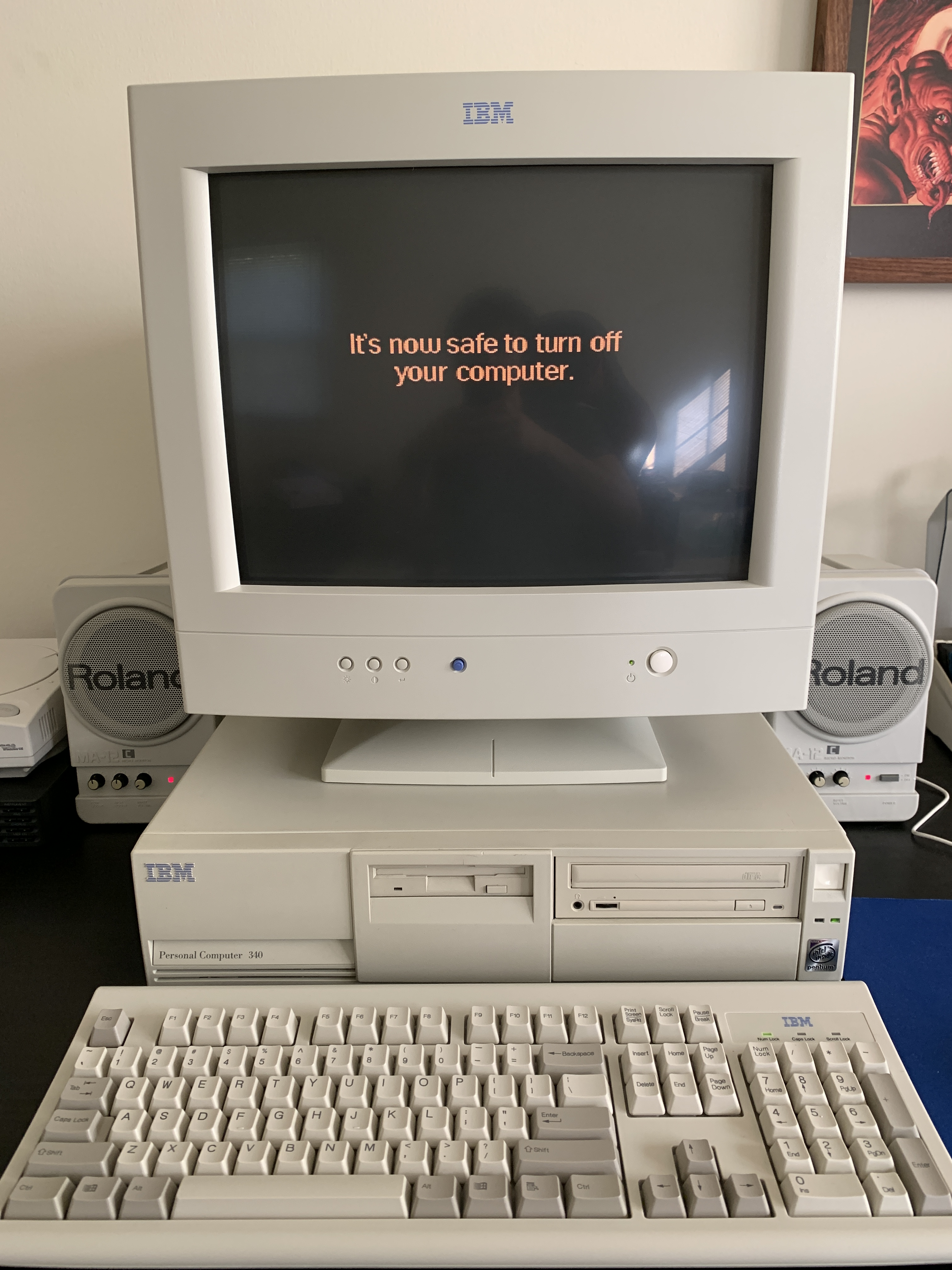
An IBM PC 340

The PC 340, introduced in 1996, was a budget model. It used the Pentium processor clocked at 100, 133 or 166 MHz. It had 4 ISA and 3 PCI expansion slots and four (2 external 5.25 inch, 1 external and 1 internal 3.5 inch) drive bays. It had 4 SIMM-72 RAM slots, and featured an IBM SurePath BIOS.

The submodels were:

- PC 300 Series Model 340 (Model 6560-1xx)
- PC 300 Series Model 340 (Model 6560-4xx)
- PC 300 Series Model 340 (Model 6560-5xx)
- PC 300 Series Model 340 (Model 6560-6xx)
- PC 300 Series Model 340 (Model 6560-7xx)

===== PC 350 =====
The PC 350, introduced over 1994 to 1995, was a middle-class model, having the same motherboard as the PC 330 in a much roomier case with additional drive bays. Processors ranged from the 486DX2-50, 486SX-25, 486DX4-100 to the Pentium 200. It had, depending on the sub-model up to 5 ISA and/or 3 PCI expansion slots and five (2 external 5.25", 1 external and 1 internal 3.5") drive bays. Like its smaller cousin, in its latest version it had 1 DIMM-168 and 4 SIMM-72 RAM slots, and featured an IBM SurePath BIOS.

Submodels were:

PC 350 submodels
Name	Model	CPU	MHz	Remarks
Personal Computer 350	Model 6581-Kxx, Lxx, Wxx	Intel 486	25-100	OPTi chipset; shipped with ISA/VLB raiser card
Personal Computer 350	Model 6583-Kxx, Lxx, Wxx	Intel 486	25-100	OPTi chipset; shipped with ISA/PCI raiser card
Personal Computer 350	Model 6585-1xx	Intel Pentium P5	60-66	up to 133 MHz using the Pentium overdrive
Personal Computer 350	Model 6586-3xx, 4xx, 5xx, 7xx, 9xx	Intel Pentium P54C	75-100	Intel-designed motherboard with Triton chipset and Intel/AMI BIOS; up to 128 MB RAM and 512k cache
Personal Computer 350	Model 6587-5xx, 7xx, 9xx, Gxx, Kxx, Lxx	Intel Pentium P54C	75-200	Up to 192 MB RAM, CPU up to 233 MHz using a Pentium 233 MMX with 75 MHz settings.

===== PC 360 =====
The PC 360 was an ISA/PCI-based system with six expansion slots that uses the Pentium Pro CPU clocked at 150 or 200 MHz. It is packaged in a mini-tower with six drive bays. It had 4 SIMM-72 slots for a total of up to 128 MB of memory, and featured an IBM SurePath BIOS. The submodels were:

- PC 360 Series Model 360 S150 (Model 6598-Cxx)
- PC 360 Series Model 360 S200 (Model 6598-Fxx)

===== PC 365 =====
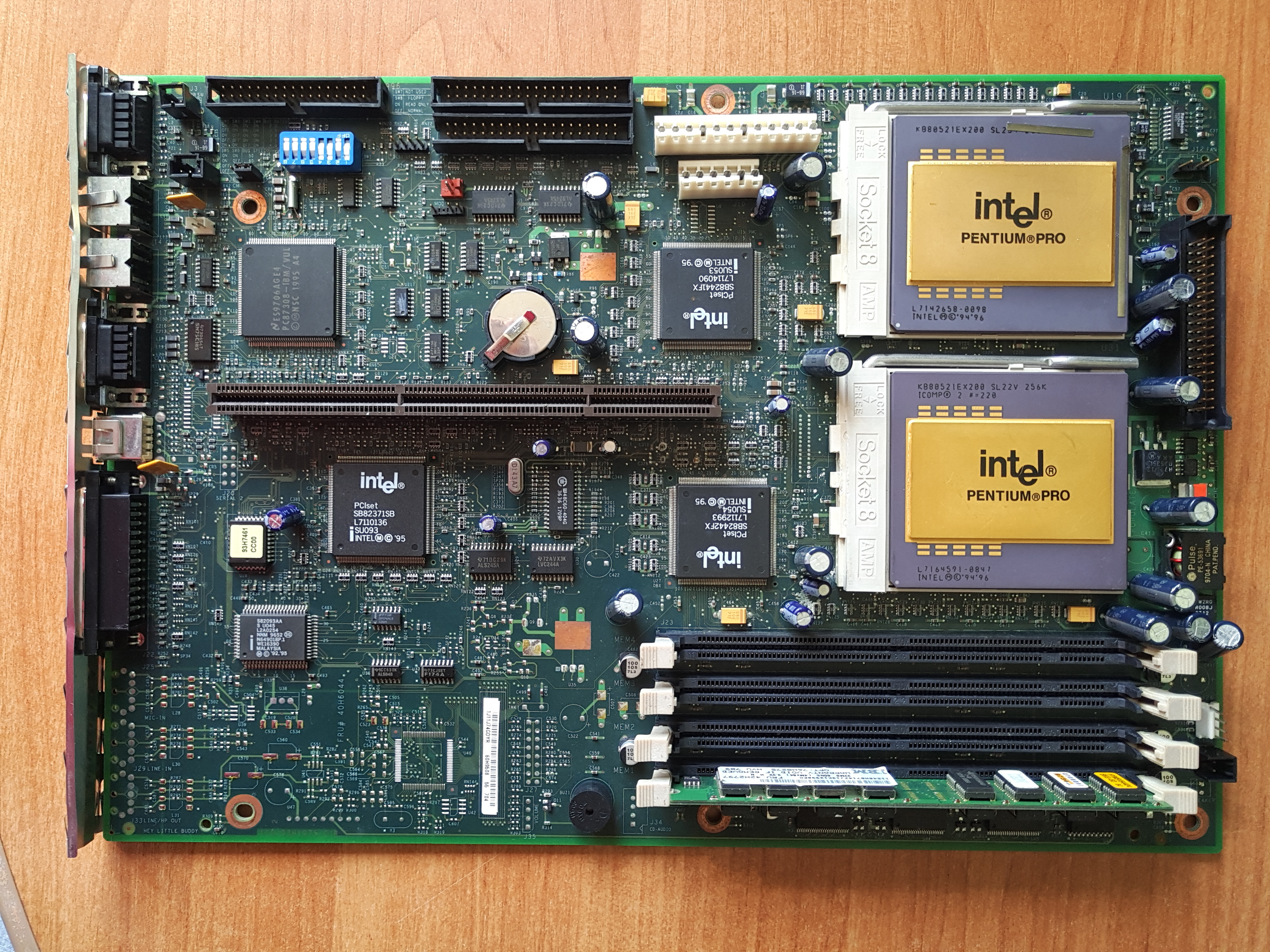
Dual Socket 8 motherboard of the PC 365

The PC 365 is an ISA/PCI-based multiprocessor system with five expansion slots. It supports dual Pentium Pro processors clocked at 180 or 200 MHz. The case has five drive bays and either two ISA or PCI slots, plus an additional three of which are shared ISA/PCI slots. It had 4 DIMM-168 slots for a total of up to 512 MB of memory, and featured an IBM SurePath BIOS. The submodels were:

- PC 365 Series Model 360 S180 (Model 6589-10U, 11U, 17U)
- PC 365 Series Model 360 S200 (Model 6589-12U, 13U, 15U, 18U)

==== PC Series 700 ====
These systems used the Intel Pentium processor with clock frequencies of 75, 90, 100, 133 and 166 MHz. Initial systems had selectable bus architecture (SelectaBus) through a replaceable riser card. Options were either PCI/ISA or PCI/MCA. The ISA or MCA bus would be connected to the PCI bus using a PCI to ISA/MCA bridge. The advantage of this is that even operating systems without MCA support worked on the system, as long as the MCA portion was not required.

Two form-factors were available, the 3x3 (3 slot, 3 bay) PC 730 and the larger 5x5 (5 slot, 5 bay) PC 750.

==== PC Series 3000 ====
This series was introduced in April 1996 in Canada only. It has a Pentium processor clocked at speeds ranging from 100 to 166 MHz and was shipped with a Mwave modem/sound card.

==== PC 300PL ====
The 300PL used three models of processors during its lifetime, the Pentium MMX, Pentium II and Pentium III. Models using the Pentium MMX came in speeds of 166, 200 and 233 MHz; models using the Pentium II came in speeds of 266, 300, 333, 350, 400 or 450 MHz; and models using the Pentium III came in speeds of 450, 500, 533, 550, 600, 667, 733, 800 or 866 MHz. The 300PL usually shipped with a hard drive with a capacity ranging from 2 GB to 20 GB, a CD-ROM drive, and a floppy drive. In some models, an IBM EtherJet 10/100 Ethernet network adapter is also included. The IBM 300PL came either in a tower or a desktop form-factor.

Four different types of form-factors exist:

- Three PCI slots, no AGP; it also has an extra bay for a CD or DVD drive (desktop)
- Three PCI slots and one AGP; it also an extra bay for a CD or DVD drive (desktop)
- Four PCI slots and one AGP; it also has an extra bay for a CD or DVD drive (desktop)
- Six PCI slots and one AGP; it also has two extra bays for a CD or DVD drive (tower)

==== PC 300GL ====
The PC 300GL used Intel Celeron, Pentium, Pentium MMX, Pentium II and Pentium III processors throughout its lifetime. Celeron-based models had processors clocked at 333, 366, 433, 466, 500 or 533 MHz; Pentium-based models had processors clocked at 133, 166, 200 MHz; Pentium MMX-based models had processors clocked at 166, 200, or 233 MHz; Pentium II-based models had processors clocked at 350, 400, 450 MHz; and Pentium III-based models had processors clocked at 450, 500, 533, 550, 600, 667, 733, 800 or 866 MHz.

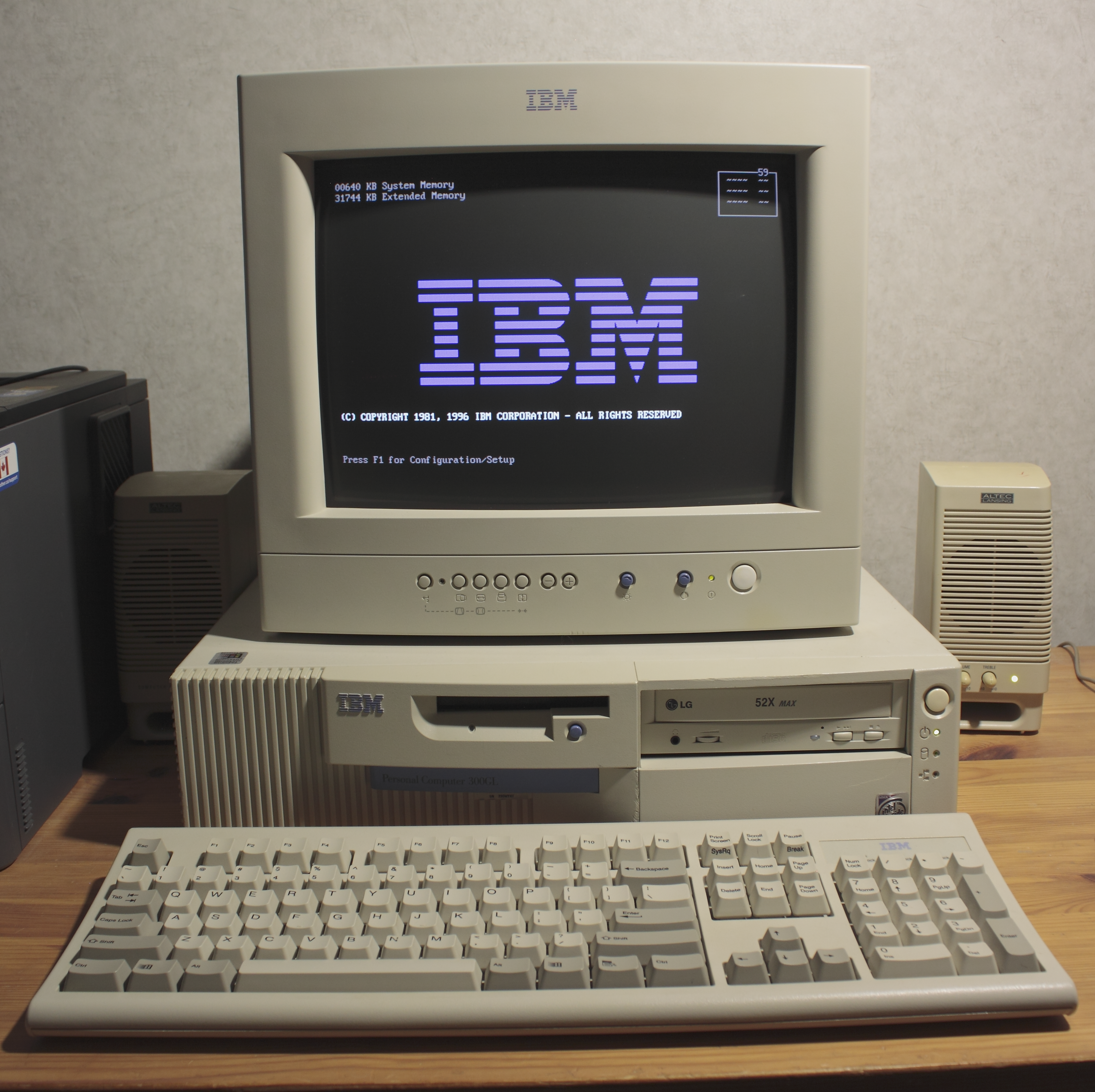
An IBM PC 300GL 6282 desktop

These systems were packaged in three case form-factors, desktop, micro-tower and mini-tower.

Desktop
Four slots with four drive bays
or two slots with three drive bays
Micro-tower
Four slots with four drive bays
Mini-tower
Six slots with six drive bays

Slot types varied between models some being all PCI with one AGP4x slot or others a desktop riser card with one ISA and PCI slot and two shared PCI-ISA slots. Both SCSI and EIDE hard drives where available with capacities between 1.2GBs and 30GBs. Display adapters, Video memory, RAM, Ethernet, CD-ROM drives, and Audio adapters vary greatly from introduction to withdrawal from market.

All systems supported disketteless operation and shipped with a standard 3.5" 1.44MB HD floppy disk drive earlier systems could also use 3.5" 2.88MB, and 5.25" 1.2MB floppy disk drives. Two slot desktop models could ship without a 3.5" diskette drive.

==== PC 300XL ====
The PC 300XL uses the Pentium MMX clocked at 233 MHz, or the Pentium II clocked at 233, 266 or 300 MHz. It features integrated 10/100 Ethernet.

=== PC Power Series ===
This is the PC counterpart of the RS/6000

- PowerPC 604 processor at 100, 120 or 133 MHz
- ISA/PCI PReP architecture
- 16 MB parity memory standard, expandable to 192 MB
- Integrated 10baseT Ethernet, PCI Graphics and Audio
- Supports Windows NT 3.51, 4.0, OS/2 Warp 3.x PPC Edition, Solaris 2.5.1 PPC or AIX Version 4 and 5XL (The four officially supported Operating Systems for PReP architecture systems)
- ARC BIOS

Two form-factors were available, the 3x3 (3 slot, 3 bay) PC830 and the larger 5x5 (5 slot, 5 bay) PC850.

Name	Model	CPU	MHz	RS/6000 counterpart
Personal Computer Power Series 440	6015	PowerPC 601 (With CPU Upg. card 604)	66	Model 7020 (40P)
Personal Computer Power Series 830	6050	PowerPC 604	100/120/133	Model 7248 (43P)
Personal Computer Power Series 850	6070	PowerPC 604	100/120/133	Model 7248 (43P)

== Timeline ==
Timeline of the IBM Personal Computer

Asterisk (*) denotes a model released in Japan only

== See also ==
- IBM IntelliStation
- IBM System AIX

Preceded by IBM PS/2	IBM Personal Computers; 1994 - 2000	Succeeded by IBM IntelliStation
Preceded by IBM PS/ValuePoint	IBM Personal Computers; 1994 - 2000	Succeeded by IBM NetVista
