= IBM IntelliStation =

Workstations family by IBM

IntelliStation
- Developer: IBM
- Type: Workstation
- Released: 1997 (IntelliStation); 2002 (IntelliStation POWER)
- Discontinued: January 2009
- CPU: x86 (IntelliStation); IBM POWER or PowerPC (IntelliStation POWER)
- Predecessor: x86: IBM PC Series; POWER: IBM RS/6000 PowerStation
- Successor: Lenovo ThinkStation
- Website: ibm.com/servers/intellistation at the Wayback Machine (archived 2005-10-13)

The IntelliStation is a family of workstations developed by IBM and first released in March 1997 as the follow-on to the PC Series 360 and 365. Certain IntelliStation M Pro Series were near hardware identical to low end IBM Netfinity 1000 Series network servers (with variants in included video cards and SCSI options). In February 2002, POWER processor-based workstations, previously sold directly under the eServer pSeries brand, were also placed under the IntelliStation umbrella.

The last IntelliStation models were discontinued in January 2009, ending the product line.

IBM IntelliStation models list
Sockets	Position	1997	1998	1999	2000	2001	2002	2003	2004	2005	2006	2007	2008	2009
x86-based
1	Entry		E 6893	E 6893; E 6867	E 6836–6846; E 6204–6214			E 6216–6226						
1	Midrange	M 6888				M 6849; M 6231; M 6233		M 6229; M 6219	M 6220–6230; M 6218		M 6225; M 9229			
1	Rackmount					R 8654	R 6851							
2	Midrange		M 6898	M 6889	M 6889	M 6850								
2	AMD-based								A 6224	A 6217				
2	High-end	Z 6899	Z 6865		Z 6866			Z 6221		Z 6223; Z 9228				
Itanium-based
2	High-end					Z 6894								
Power-based
1 OR 2	Midrange										185 (7047)			
1 OR 2	High-end							275 (9114)			285 (9111)			
2	High-end						265 (9112)							

== IntelliStation Pro ==
Intel or AMD processor based workstations, discontinued in March 2008.

=== IntelliStation A Pro ===
Type 6224 (March 2004 to July 2005)

- Dual AMD Opteron Models 244, 246, 248, 250 and 256 (no dual-core support)
- Up to 16 GB PC3200 memory
- Ultra320 SCSI or SATA150 HDD
- 10/100/1000 Mbit Ethernet
- Graphic adapter options:
  - Nvidia Quadro NVS 280
  - Nvidia Quadro FX 1100
  - Nvidia Quadro FX 3000
  - Nvidia Quadro FX 4000

Type 6217 (April 2005 to April 2007)

- Dual AMD Opteron Models 250, 252, 254, 256 or dual-core Model 275, 280 or 285
- Up to 16 GB PC3200 memory
- Ultra320 SCSI or SATA150 HDD
- 10/100/1000 Mbit Ethernet
- Graphic adapter options:
  - Nvidia Quadro NVS 280
  - Nvidia Quadro NVS 285
  - Nvidia Quadro FX 1400
  - Nvidia Quadro FX 1500
  - Nvidia Quadro FX 3400
  - Nvidia Quadro FX 3500
  - Nvidia Quadro FX 4500
  - Nvidia Quadro FX 4500 X2
  - 3DLabs Wildcat Realizm 800

=== IntelliStation E Pro ===
Type 6893 (June 1998 to June 1999)

- Intel Pentium II at 350, 400 or 450 MHz (100 MHz FSB)
- Up to 384 MB PC100 memory
- Ultra Wide SCSI or ATA HDD
- 10/100 Mbit Ethernet
- Graphic adapter options:
  - Matrox Millennium II
  - Matrox Millennium G200
  - 3DLabs Permedia 2A

Type 6893 (March 1999 to June 2000)

- Intel Pentium III at 450, 500, 550 or 600 MHz (100 MHz FSB)
- Up to 768 MB PC100 memory
- Ultra Wide SCSI or ATA HDD
- 10/100 Mbit Ethernet
- Graphic adapter options:
  - Matrox Millennium G200
  - Matrox Millennium G400
  - IBM/Diamond Fire GL1 graphics adapter
  - Appian J Pro

Type 6867 (November 1999 to November 2000)

- Intel Pentium III at 600, 667, 733, 866 or 933 MHz (133 MHz FSB)
- Up to 512 MB RDRAM
- Ultra-2 SCSI or ATA66 HDD
- 10/100 Mbit Ethernet
- Graphic adapter options:
  - Matrox Millennium G400
  - ELSA GLoria II
  - Appian Gemini
  - IBM/Diamond Fire GL1

Type 6836–6846 (October 2000 to January 2002)

- Intel Pentium III at 800, 866, 933 MHz, or 1 GHz (133 MHz FSB)
- Up to 1.5 GB PC133 memory
- Ultra160 SCSI or ATA66 HDD
- 10/100 Mbit Ethernet
- Graphic adapter options:
  - Matrox Millennium G450
  - Nvidia GeForce 2 MX

Type 6204–6214 (September 2001 to September 2002)

- Intel Pentium 4 at 1.6, 1.8, 2.0 or 2.2 GHz
- Up to 1.5 GB PC133 memory
- Ultra160 SCSI or ATA100 HDD
- 10/100 Mbit Ethernet
- Graphic adapter options:
  - Matrox Millennium G450
  - Nvidia Vanta
  - Nvidia GeForce2 EX
  - Nvidia GeForce2 Pro
  - Nvidia Quadro 4 200NVS
  - ATI FireGL 8800

Type 6216–6226 (July 2002 to October 2003)

- Intel Pentium 4 at 2.0, 2.26, 2.4, 2.67 or 2.8 GHz
- Up to 2 GB PC2100 memory
- Ultra160 SCSI or ATA100 HDD
- 10/100/1000 Mbit Ethernet
- Graphic adapter options:
  - Matrox Millennium G450
  - Nvidia Quadro 4 200NVS
  - Nvidia Quadro 4 280NVS
  - Nvidia Quadro 4 580XGL
  - ATI FireGL 8800

=== IntelliStation M Pro ===
Type 6888 (May 1997 to July 1998)

- Intel Pentium II at 266 or 300 MHz
- Up to 512 MB EDO memory
- Ultra Wide SCSI HDD
- 10/100 Mbit Ethernet
- Intergraph Intense3D Pro1000/T video adapter

Type 6898 (October 1997 to October 1998)

- Dual Intel Pentium II at 233, 266, 300 or 333 MHz
- Up to 512 MB SDRAM
- Ultra Wide SCSI or ATA33 HDD
- 10/100 Mbit Ethernet
- Graphic adapter options:
  - Intergraph Intense3D Pro2200/4T
  - Intergraph Intense3D Pro2200/GA
  - 3DLabs Permedia 2

Type 6889 (July 1998 to June 1999)

- Dual Intel Pentium II at 350, 400 or 450 MHz (100 MHz FSB)
- Up to 1 GB SDRAM
- Ultra Wide SCSI or ATA HDD
- 10/100 Mbit Ethernet
- Graphic adapter options:
  - Matrox Millennium II
  - Matrox Millennium G200
  - 3DLabs Permedia 2A
  - Intergraph Intense3D Pro3400
  - Intergraph Intense3D Pro3400/GA

Type 6889 (March 1999 to June 2000)

- Dual Intel Pentium III at 450, 500, 550 or 600 MHz (100 MHz FSB)
- Up to 1 GB SDRAM
- Ultra Wide SCSI or ATA HDD
- 10/100 Mbit Ethernet
- Graphic adapter options:
  - Matrox Millennium G200
  - Matrox Millennium G400
  - IBM/Diamond Fire GL1 graphics adapter
  - Appian J Pro

Type 6889 (October 1999 to June 2000)

- Dual Intel Pentium III at 600, 667, 733, 933 MHz or 1 GHz (133 MHz FSB)
- Up to 2 GB RDRAM
- Ultra Wide SCSI or ATA66 HDD
- 10/100 Mbit Ethernet
- Graphic adapter options:
  - Matrox Millennium G400
  - ELSA GLoria II
  - Appian Gemini
  - 3DLabs Intense 3D Wildcat 4110
  - Nvidia GeForce2 MX

Type 6849 (November 2000 to June 2002)

- Intel Pentium 4 at 1.4, 1.5, 1.7, 1.8, 2.0 or 2.2 GHz
- Ultra160 SCSI or ATA100 HDD
- Up to 2 GB RDRAM
- 10/100 Mbit Ethernet
- Graphic adapter options:
  - Matrox Millennium G450
  - IBM/Diamond Fire GL2
  - IBM/Diamond Fire GL4
  - Nvidia Quadro2 MXR
  - Nvidia Quadro2 Pro
  - Nvidia Quadro4 200NVS
  - ATI FireGL 8800
  - 3Dlabs Wildcat III 6110

Type 6850 (July 2001 to January 2003)

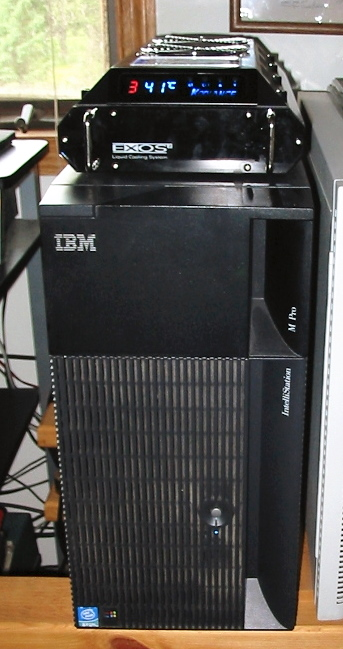
IBM 6850 M-Pro

- Dual Intel Xeon at 1.5, 1.7, 2.0 or 2.8 GHz
- Ultra160 SCSI or ATA100 HDD
- Up to 4 GB RDRAM
- 10/100 Mbit Ethernet
- Graphic adapter options:
  - Matrox Millennium G450
  - IBM/Diamond Fire GL4
  - Nvidia Quadro2 Pro
  - Nvidia Quadro4 200NVS
  - ATI FireGL 8800
  - 3DLabs Wildcat III 6110

Type 6231 (November 2001 to July 2002)

- Intel Pentium 4 at 1.8 GHz
- Up to 4 GB RDRAM
- ATA100 HDD
- 10/100 Mbit Ethernet
- Graphic adapter options:
  - Matrox Millennium G450
  - IBM/Diamond Fire GL4
  - Nvidia Quadro2 Pro

Type 6233 (November 2001 to July 2002)

- Intel Xeon at 1.7 GHz
- Up to 4 GB RDRAM
- Ultra160 SCSI or ATA100 HDD
- 10/100 Mbit Ethernet
- Graphic adapter options:
  - Matrox Millennium G450
  - IBM/Diamond Fire GL4
  - Nvidia Quadro2 Pro

Type 6229 (May 2002 to February 2003)

- Intel Pentium 4 at 2.4, 2.67 or 2.8 GHz
- Ultra160 SCSI or ATA100 HDD
- Up to 2 GB RDRAM
- 10/100 Mbit Ethernet
- Graphic adapter options:
  - Matrox Millennium G450
  - Nvidia Quadro4 200NVS
  - Nvidia Quadro4 900XGL
  - ATI FireGL 8800
  - 3DLabs Wildcat III 6110

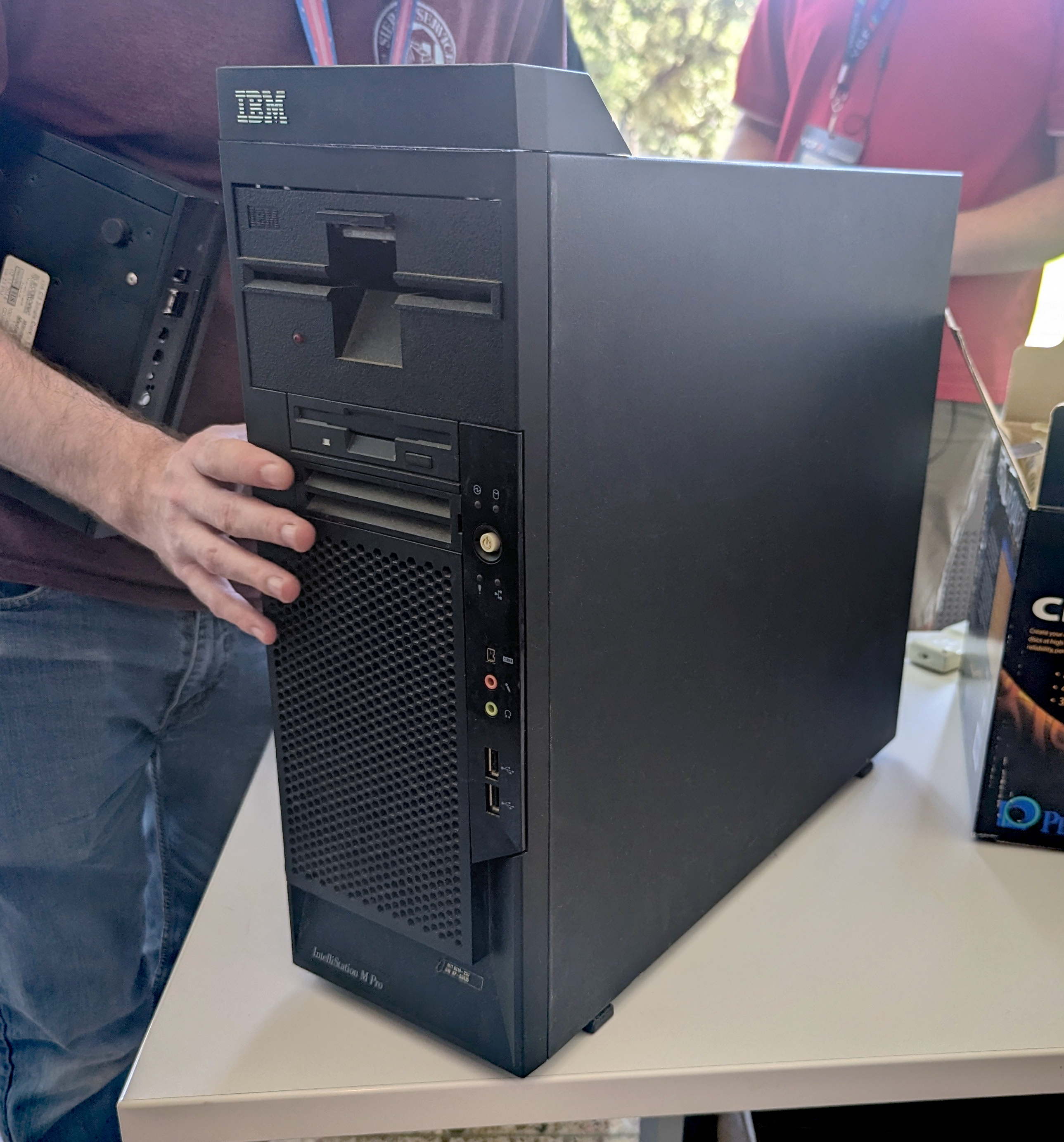
IBM IntelliStation M Pro 6219

Type 6219 (November 2002 to October 2003)

- Intel Pentium 4 at 2.4, 2.67, 2.8 or 3.06 GHz
- Up to 4 GB PC2100 memory
- Ultra320 SCSI or ATA100 HDD
- 10/100/1000 Mbit Ethernet
- Graphic adapter options:
  - Matrox Millennium G450
  - Nvidia Quadro4 280NVS
  - Nvidia Quadro4 580XGL
  - Nvidia Quadro4 980XGL
  - 3DLabs Wildcat4 7110

Type 6220–6230 (July 2003 to March 2005)

- Intel Pentium 4 at 2.8, 3.0, 3.06, 3.2 or 3.4 GHz
- Up to 4 GB PC2700 memory
- Ultra320 SCSI, ATA100 or SATA150 HDD
- 10/100/1000 Mbit Ethernet
- graphic adapter options:
  - NVIDIA Quadro4 280NVS
  - NVIDIA Quadro4 580XGL
  - NVIDIA Quadro4 980XGL
  - NVIDIA Quadro FX 500
  - NVIDIA Quadro FX 1000
  - NVIDIA Quadro FX 1100
  - NVIDIA Quadro FX 3000

Type 6225 (October 2004 to March 2006)

- Intel Pentium 4 with Intel 64 (formerly EM64T) at 3.0, 3.2, 3.4, 3.6 or 3.8 GHz
- Up to 4 GB PC2-3200 memory
- Ultra320 SCSI or SATA150 HDD
- 10/100/1000 Mbit Ethernet
- graphic adapter options:
  - NVIDIA Quadro NVS 280
  - NVIDIA Quadro FX 1300
  - NVIDIA Quadro FX 1400
  - NVIDIA Quadro FX 3400
  - ATI FireGL V3100
  - ATI FireGL V7100
  - 3DLabs Realizm 800

Type 6218 (August 2005)

- Intel Pentium 4 with Intel 64 (formerly EM64T) at 3.0, 3.2, 3.4, 3.6 and 3.8 GHz or dual-core 3.2 or 3.4 GHz
- Up to 8 GB PC2-4200 memory
- Ultra320 SCSI or SATA300 HDD
- 10/100/1000 Mbit Ethernet
- graphic adapter options:
  - NVIDIA Quadro NVS 280
  - NVIDIA Quadro NVS 285
  - NVIDIA Quadro FX 1400
  - NVIDIA Quadro FX 4500
  - ATI FireGL V3100
  - ATI FireGL V7100
  - 3DLabs Realizm 800

Type 9229 (September 2006)

- Intel Core 2 Duo with E6300, E6400, E6600, E6700 or Q6600 processor
- Up to 8 GB PC2-5300 memory
- 3Gbit SAS or SATA300 HDD
- 10/100/1000 Mbit Ethernet
- graphic adapter options:
  - NVIDIA Quadro NVS 285
  - NVIDIA Quadro FX 550
  - NVIDIA Quadro FX 1500
  - NVIDIA Quadro FX 3500

=== IntelliStation R Pro ===
Relabeled IBM eServer xSeries 330 1U rackmount servers.

Type 8654 (March 2001 to September 2001)

- Intel Pentium III at 1.0 GHz
- Up to 4 GB ECC SDRAM
- Ultra160 SCSI or ATA HDD
- Dual 10/100 Mbit Ethernet
- PCI Quad-port Matrox G200 MMS videocard
- PCI Audio adapter

Type 6851 (August 2001 to July 2002)

- Intel Pentium III at 1.13 or 1.26 GHz
- Up to 4 GB ECC SDRAM
- Ultra160 SCSI or ATA HDD
- Dual 10/100 Mbit Ethernet
- PCI quad-port Matrox G200 MMS videocard
- PCI audio adapter

=== IntelliStation Z Pro ===
Type 6899 (March 1997 to ??)

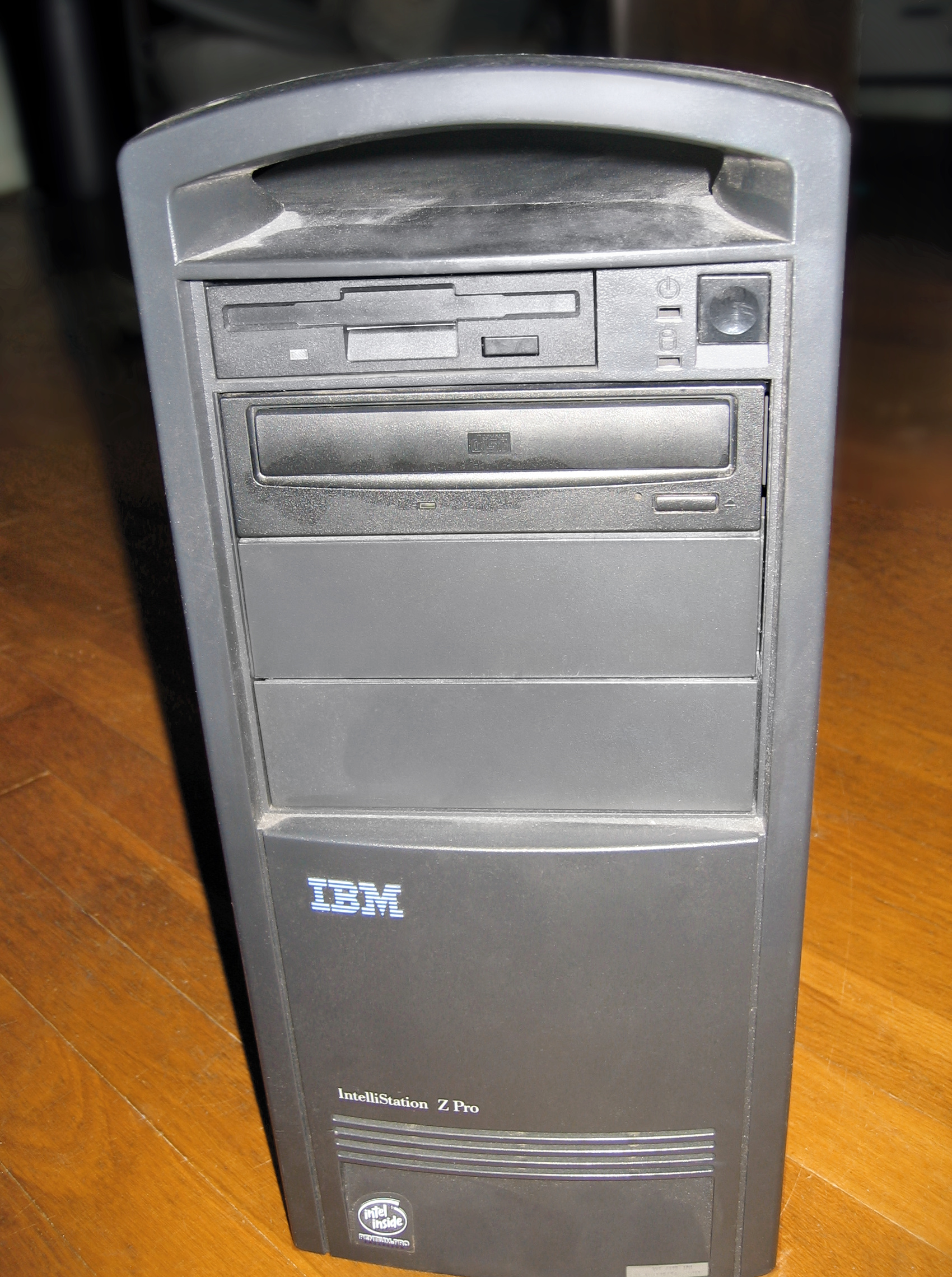
IntelliStation Z pro 6899 - based on a IBM Aptiva desktop.

- Dual Intel Pentium Pro at 200 MHz 256kB/512kB L2 cache (66 MHz FSB), Pentium II Overdrive P6T ready
- Intel 440FX/82371SB chipset with DEC PCI-to-PCI bridge (spec. 2.1) and APM 1.1
- Up to 1 GB EDO memory (4 DIMM, 168 pins)
- Ultra Wide SCSI HDD (with Adaptec AHA-2940 adapter in PCI slot)
- 10/100 Mbit Ethernet (with Intel EtherExpress Pro/100 adapter in PCI slot)
- Onboard audio Crystal Semiconductor (single chip)
- 1 shared ISA/PCI connector, 2 dedicated ISA connectors, and 4 dedicated PCI connectors; via Riser
- Graphic adapter options:
  - Matrox Millennium II (up to 8MB WRAM)
  - Intergraph Intense3D Pro1000/T video adapter (16MB + 4MB)

Type 6865 (October 1998 to April 2000)

- Dual Intel Pentium II Xeon at 400, 450, 500 or 550 MHz (100 MHz FSB)
- Up to 2 GB SDRAM
- Ultra-2 SCSI HDD
- 10/100 Mbit Ethernet
- Graphic adapter options:
  - Matrox Millennium G200
  - Matrox Millennium G400
  - Intergraph Intense3D Pro3400
  - Intergraph Intense3D Pro3400/GA
  - IBM/Diamond Fire GL1
  - 3DLabs Intense 3D Wildcat 4000 (RA and GA)

Type 6866 (January 2000 to March 2002)

- Dual Intel Pentium III Xeon at 677, 733, 800, 866, 933 MHz, or 1 GHz (133 MHz FSB)
- Up to 2 GB RDRAM
- Ultra160 SCSI HDD
- 10/100 Mbit Ethernet
- Graphic adapter options:
  - Matrox Millennium G400
  - Matrox Millennium G450
  - IBM/Diamond Fire GL1
  - IBM/Diamond Fire GL2
  - ELSA GLoria II
  - 3DLabs Intense 3D Wildcat 4110
  - 3Dlabs Intense 3D Wildcat 4210
  - NVIDIA Quadro2 MXR

Type 6894 (May 2001 to June 2002)

The only Itanium-equipped model, with the same platform as an identical Dell, Fujitsu or HP workstations, and based on a SGI reference design; the main difference between vendor variants was only a hardware support, software options and case colors.

- Dual Intel Itanium at 800 MHz
- Up to 16 GB SDRAM
- Ultra160 SCSI HDD
- 10/100 Mbit Ethernet
- Graphic options:
  - Matrox Millennium G450
  - Nvidia Quadro2 Pro

Type 6221 (November 2002 to February 2005)

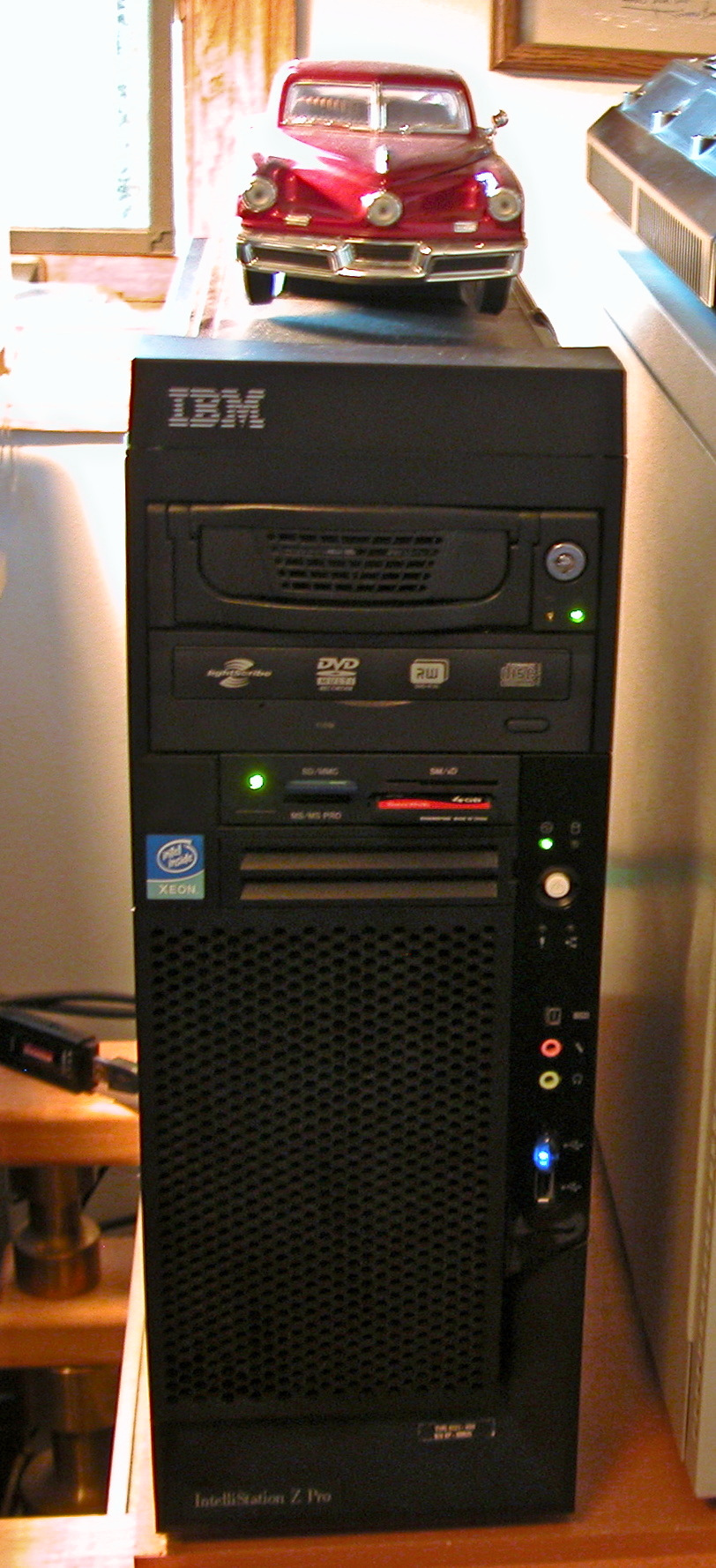
IBM Z Pro 6221 - based on a IBM xSeries tower servers

- Dual Intel Xeon at 2.4, 2.67, 2.8 or 3.2 GHz
- Up to 8 GB PC2100 memory
- Ultra320 SCSI or ATA100 HDD
- 10/100/1000 Mbit Ethernet
- Graphic options (AGP-based):
  - Matrox Millennium G450
  - NVIDIA Quadro4 280NVS
  - NVIDIA Quadro4 980XGL
  - NVIDIA Quadro FX 1000
  - NVIDIA Quadro FX 1100
  - NVIDIA Quadro FX 3000
  - 3DLabs Wildcat4 7110

Type 6223 (August 2004 to March 2007)

- Dual Intel Xeon with Intel 64 (formerly EM64T) at 3.0, 3.2, 3.4, 3.6 or 3.8 GHz
- Up to 16 GB PC2-3200 memory
- Ultra320 SCSI or ATA100 HDD
- 10/100/1000 Mbit Ethernet
- Graphic options (PCI-e based):
  - NVIDIA Quadro4 NVS280
  - NVIDIA Quadro4 NVS285
  - NVIDIA Quadro FX 1300
  - NVIDIA Quadro FX 1400
  - NVIDIA Quadro FX 3400
  - NVIDIA Quadro FX 3500
  - NVIDIA Quadro FX 4500
  - ATI FireGL V7100
  - 3DLabs Wildcat Realizm 800

Type 9228 (June 2006)

- Dual Intel Xeon Model 5130, 5140, 5150 or 5160
- Up to 32 GB PC2-5300 memory
- 3Gbit SAS or SATA300 HDD
- 10/100/1000 Mbit Ethernet
- graphic options (PCI-e based):
  - NVIDIA Quadro NVS 285
  - NVIDIA Quadro FX 550
  - NVIDIA Quadro FX 1500
  - NVIDIA Quadro FX 3500
  - NVIDIA Quadro FX 4500

== IntelliStation POWER ==
IBM POWER processor based workstations. The POWER 185 and 285 models were the last Power-based workstations from IBM, having been discontinued on 2 January 2009.

=== IntelliStation POWER 265 ===
Type 9112-265 (February 2002 to September 2003)

- Dual POWER3-II processors at 450 MHz
- Up to 8 GB of memory
- Ultra160 SCSI HDD
- 10/100 Mbit Ethernet
- Graphic adapter options:
  - GXT135P (PCI-based Matrox G450 with 32 MB)
  - GXT4500P
  - GXT6500P

=== IntelliStation POWER 275 ===
Type 9114-275 (June 2003 to February 2006)

- Single or Dual Core POWER4+ processors at 1.0 or 1.45 GHz
- Up to 16 GB of memory
- Ultra320 SCSI HDD
- 2 Ethernet ports; one 10/100 Mbit, one 10/100/1000 Mbit
- Graphic adapter options:
  - GXT135P
  - GXT4500P
  - GXT6500P

=== IntelliStation POWER 285 ===
Type 9111-285 (October 2005 to January 2009)

- Single or Dual Core POWER5+ processor at 1.9 or 2.1 GHz
- Up to 32 GB of memory
- Ultra320 SCSI HDD
- Dual 10/100/1000 Mbit Ethernet
- Graphic adapter options:
  - GXT135P
  - GXT4500P
  - GXT6500P

=== IntelliStation POWER 185 ===
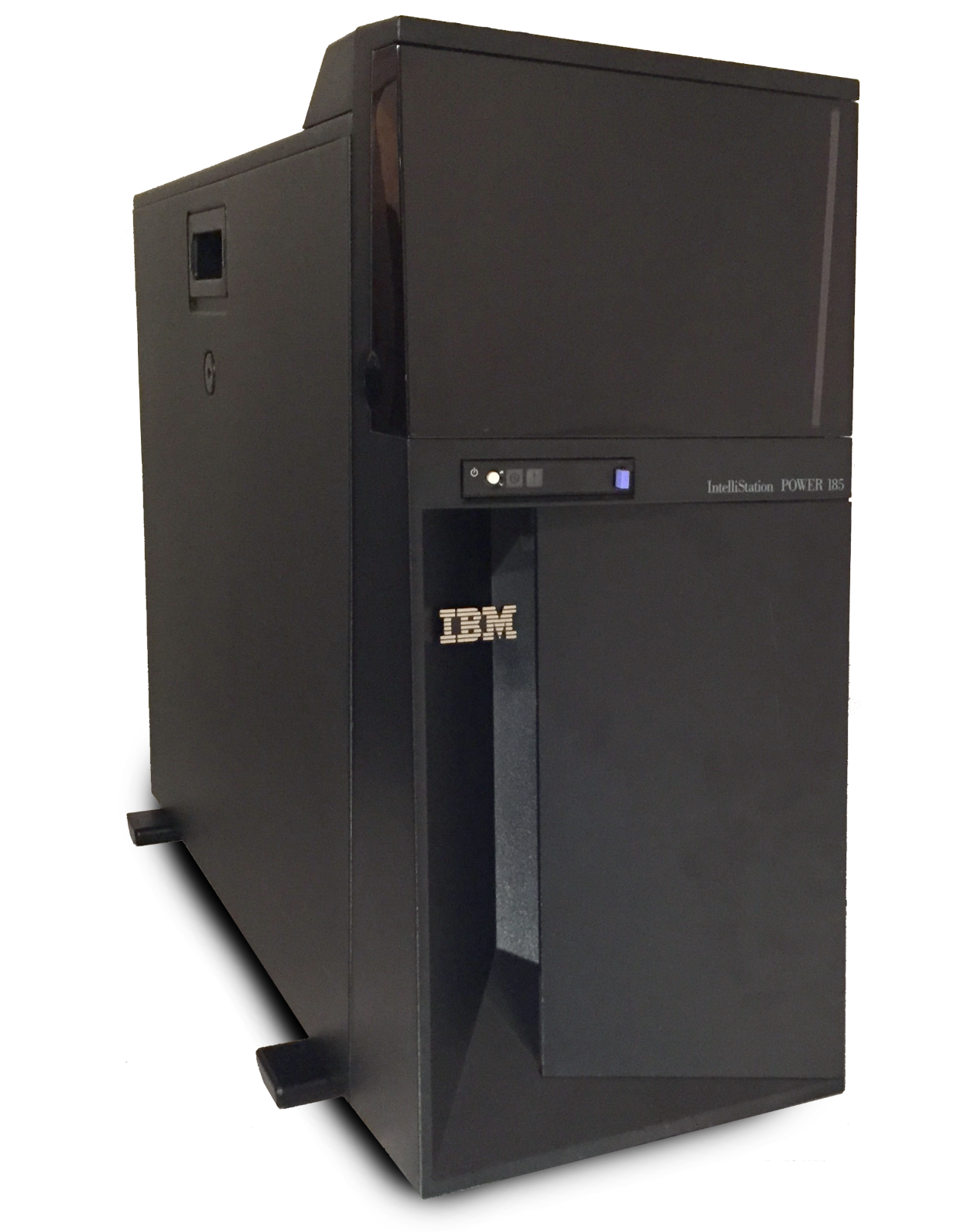
IBM IntelliStation POWER 185

Type 7047-185 (February 2006 to January 2009)

- Single or Dual PowerPC 970 processors at 2.5 GHz
- Up to 8 GB of memory
- Ultra320 SCSI HDD
- Dual 10/100/1000 Mbit Ethernet
- Sound Card option with Feature Code 8244
- graphic adapter options:
  - GXT135P
  - GXT4500P
  - GXT6500P

== See also ==
- IBM PC Series

Preceded by IBM RS/6000 PowerStation	IBM IntelliStation; 1997–2009	Succeeded by Lenovo ThinkStation
Preceded by IBM PC Series (365 and 360)	IBM IntelliStation; 1997–2009	Succeeded by Lenovo ThinkStation
