= Tandy 3000 =

1986 personal computer by Radio Shack

- Type: Personal computer
- Released: 1986; 40 years ago
- Operating system: MS-DOS 3.2, DeskMate, Xenix
- CPU: Intel 80286 @ 8 MHz at intro, later 12 MHz
- Memory: 512 KB - 640 KB (up to 12 MB in expansion slots, later 16 MB)
- Display: no video on motherboard, must use video card in expansion slot: MDA
- Graphics: uses standard IBM video cards in expansion slot: CGA, EGA, VGA or HGA
- Predecessor: Tandy 2000
- Successor: Tandy 2500 XL & Tandy 4000 series

The Tandy 3000 is a personal computer introduced by Radio Shack in 1986 based on the 16-bit 8 MHz Intel 80286 microprocessor.

== Description ==
The Tandy 3000 is functionally a clone of the IBM PC-AT, the first PC by a major manufacturer using the fully 16-bit Intel 286 processor. As such, it departed from Tandy's two previous PC workalikes (the Tandy 2000 in 1983 and the Tandy 1000 in 1985) in that it was built without proprietary technology. The motherboard contains no built-in circuitry for its disk controller or video display. Owners could outfit the computer, and upgrade it, with standard PC components sold by Tandy or available from third-party suppliers. Since the hardware is industry-standard throughout, there were no compatibility issues such as there were with the previous models 2000 and 1000. More accurately, any compatibility troubles that might arise were no fault of the computer, but rather, any third-party hardware installed or with the AT architecture upon which the computer was engineered.

The operating system was an extra-cost item; the purchaser could choose MS-DOS 3.2 or Xenix V. Xenix and the extra memory it demanded was expensive but permitted up to six remote terminals to run programs on a single Tandy 3000 simultaneously. Microsoft BASIC, bundled with Tandy's DeskMate productivity suite, was offered at extra cost. Digital Research's CP/M-86 was an option available from other software vendors. Later, others available for generic AT clones such as the Tandy 3000 included IBM's PC DOS, Digital Research's DR-DOS and GEM, and 16-bit versions of Microsoft Windows (up to version 3.x). Still later IBM's graphical multitasking OS/2 was an option for machines equipped with enough memory and capable graphics display hardware.

Base memory was 512 KB, expandable to 640 KB on the motherboard. RAM was expandable to a maximum of 12 MB using cards in the expansion slots.

The Tandy 3000 has ten expansion slots: seven 16-bit AT compatible, two 8-bit XT compatible, and one half-size XT slot dedicated to the included serial/parallel card. After the disk controller card and the video card are installed, six additional expansion slots are available, which is one more than the PC-AT offers. On the other hand, the Tandy computer lacks the AT's locking keyswitch for operational security.

There are three drive bays available; two are accessible through the front panel, so two may be floppy drives or other replaceable media like a PCMCIA card reader. A single 1.2 MB 5.25 inch floppy disk drive was included in the base configuration. This drive was first introduced by IBM for the PC-AT, and was unique to it. Like IBM's later PS/2 series and other newer computers in the industry, Tandy's follow-on computers would discontinue using this drive and switch to the 3.5 inch format.

From Tandy two sizes of hard drives were available: 20 MB and 35 MB. Being a generic AT clone wearing the Tandy badge, any third-party drives compatible with the AT could be installed. In later years drives with capacities far greater than 35 MB became available for installation, though the MS-DOS 3.2 most often purchased with the computer could not manage so much storage without partitioning. Two hard drives could be installed in the cabinet, provided the controller card could handle two. There is an available socket on the motherboard for an 287 math co-processor.

The Tandy 3000 has a smaller desk footprint than the AT; it occupies 342 square inches (19 x 18 inches or 48 x 46 cm) which is less than the AT's footprint of 367.2 square inches (21.25 x 17.28 inches or 54 x 43.9 cm).

Two years after its introduction, the Tandy 3000 was improved with a 286 processor that ran at a clock rate of 12 MHz, which could be switched to 6 MHz. The motherboard was revised to permit up to 16 MB of RAM in the expansion slots, the maximum mount of memory the 286 chip could address. Installed RAM increased to 640 KB. The AT's locking keyswitch was built in.

== Tandy 3000 HL ==
In 1987, Tandy introduced the 3000 HL, which was aimed at the budget market. This computer is functionally similar with less expandability (only three 16-bit AT slots and four 8-bit XT slots, which limit maximum RAM to 4 MB). It was limited to 8 MHz clock speed. It still has three drive bays and its new cabinet has a smaller desk footprint: 17 by 15.5 inches.

== Tandy 3000 NL ==
In 1989, Tandy updated the 3000 HL with several improvements: clock speed of 10 MHz and a 3.5 inch high density (1.44 MB) floppy disk drive. The all-new cabinet has two 3.5 inch and two 5.25 inch drive bays.

It has the same expansion slots as the 3000 HL (three AT and four XT slots) plus one high-speed 10 MHz slot dedicated to memory expansion. Maximum RAM that can be installed in the slots is now sixteen MB. The computer has a locking keyswitch.

In 1990, Tandy updated the 3000 NL's motherboard with built-in VGA circuitry, obviating the need to install a video card in an expansion slot.

== Tandy 2500 XL ==
From 1991, the 3000 line was dropped and replaced with Tandy's last PC-AT equivalent, the 2500 XL. This was housed in a new cabinet measuring 15 by 15.5 inches (38 by 39.4 cm), with two 3.5 inch and one 5.25 inch drive bays. One high density 3.5 inch 1.44 MB floppy drive comes installed. There are three 16-bit expansion slots, all of which run at the full CPU clock rate of 10 MHz. One megabyte of RAM comes installed, and using expansion slots RAM can go to 16 MB (the maximum addressable by the 286). The motherboard has a built-in SmartDrive hard drive controller. The parallel port is now bidirectional, and there is a mouse port.

By this time, the new Intel 80386SX processor, with its 16-bit external data bus, 24-bit address bus and 32-bit processor core, enabled PC makers to offer performance superior to the 286/PC-AT at more affordable prices. The full 32-bit bus of the 386DX required a more expensive circuit board and peripheral chips. Accordingly, starting in 1991, Tandy followed the industry trend of substituting computers using it for products based on the 286/PC-AT technology. Consequently the new 4016 and 4020 SX computers replaced the 2500 XL, leaving only the 1000 TL (and later the 1000 RLX) line of desktops to continue using the 286 processor, which had 8-bit XT expansion slots, not 16-bit AT compatible slots. Further, the 1000s could not run the graphical multitasking OS/2 operating system, as could the 3000 and 2500 XL.

In 1992, Tandy offered an upgraded 2500 XL with its 286 processor clocked at 16 MHz and a Super VGA (maximum pixel resolution of 1024 x 768) video card built into the motherboard. The one megabyte standard RAM is expandable to five MB without using an expansion slot.

== See also ==
- Tandy 1000
- Tandy 2000
- Tandy 6000
- TRS-80 Model II
- List of TRS-80 and Tandy-branded computers
