= List of TRS-80 and Tandy-branded computers =

Tandy Corporation released several computer product lines starting in 1977, under both TRS-80 and Tandy branding.

TRS-80 was a brand associated with several desktop microcomputer lines sold by Tandy Corporation through their Radio Shack and Tandy stores. It was first used on the original TRS-80 (later known as the Model I), one of the earliest mass-produced personal computers. However, Tandy later used the TRS-80 name on a number of different computer lines, many of which were technically unrelated to (and incompatible with) the original Model I and its replacements.

In addition to these, Tandy released a number of computers using the Tandy name itself.

== Original TRS-80 ("Model I") and its successors ==
=== Model I ===
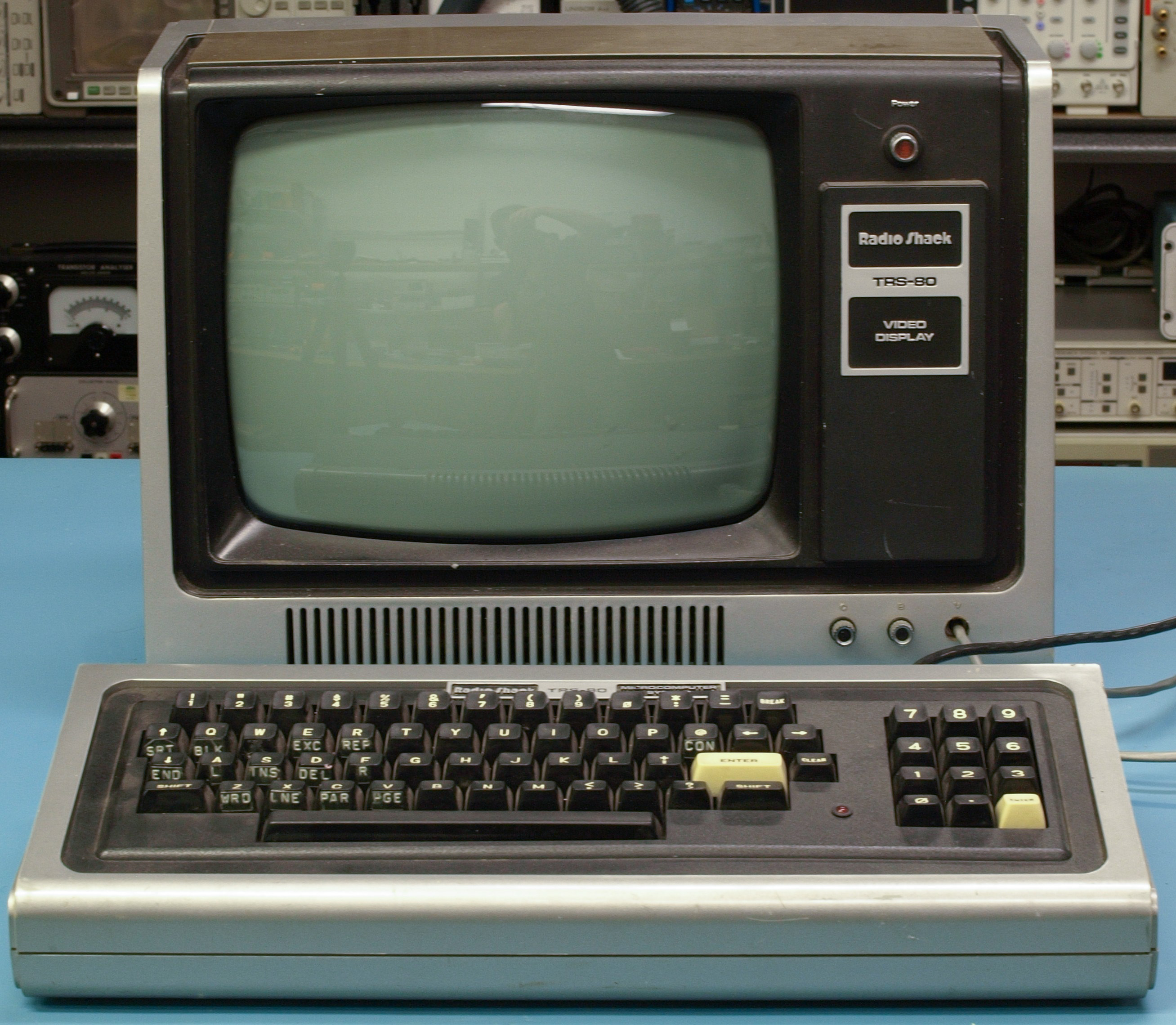
TRS-80 Model I

The original TRS-80 Micro Computer System (later known as the Model I to distinguish it from successors) was launched in 1977 and- alongside the Apple II and Commodore PET- was one of the earliest mass-produced personal computers. The line won popularity with hobbyists, home users, and small-businesses.

The Model I included a full-stroke QWERTY keyboard, floating-point BASIC, a monitor, and a starting price of US$600.

By 1979, the TRS-80 had the largest selection of software in the microcomputer market.

In July 1980 the mostly-compatible TRS-80 Model III was launched, and the original Model I was discontinued.

=== Model III ===
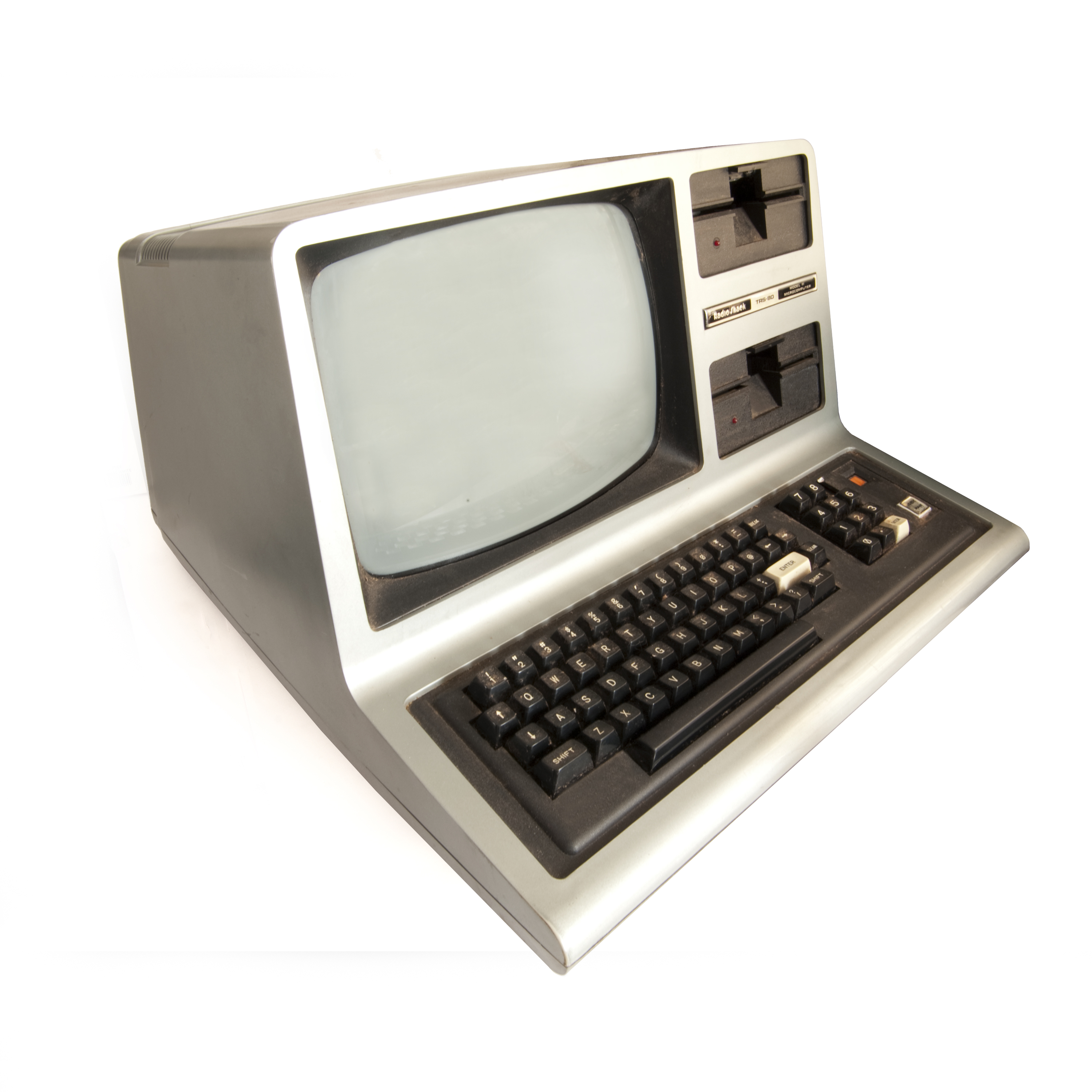
TRS-80 Model III

In July 1980 Tandy released the Model III, a mostly-compatible replacement for the Model I.

Its improvements over the Model I included built-in lower case, an upgraded keyboard, 1500-baud cassette interface, and a faster (2.03 MHz) Z80 processor. With the introduction of the Model III, Model I production was discontinued as it did not comply with new FCC regulations as of January 1, 1981 regarding electromagnetic interference.

The Model III could run about 80% of Model I software, but used an incompatible disk format. It also came with the option of integrated disk drives.

=== Model 4 ===
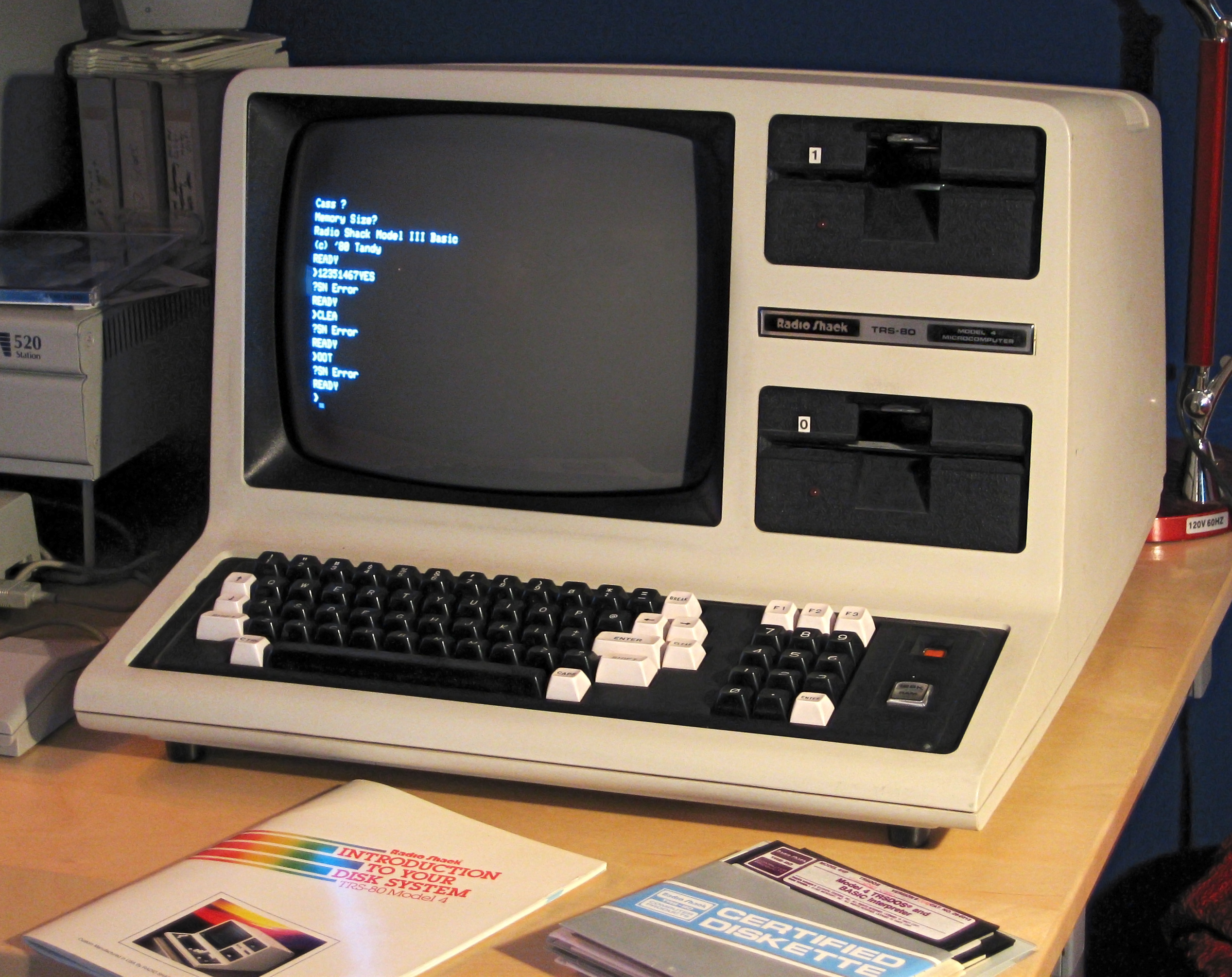
TRS-80 Model 4 (standard version)

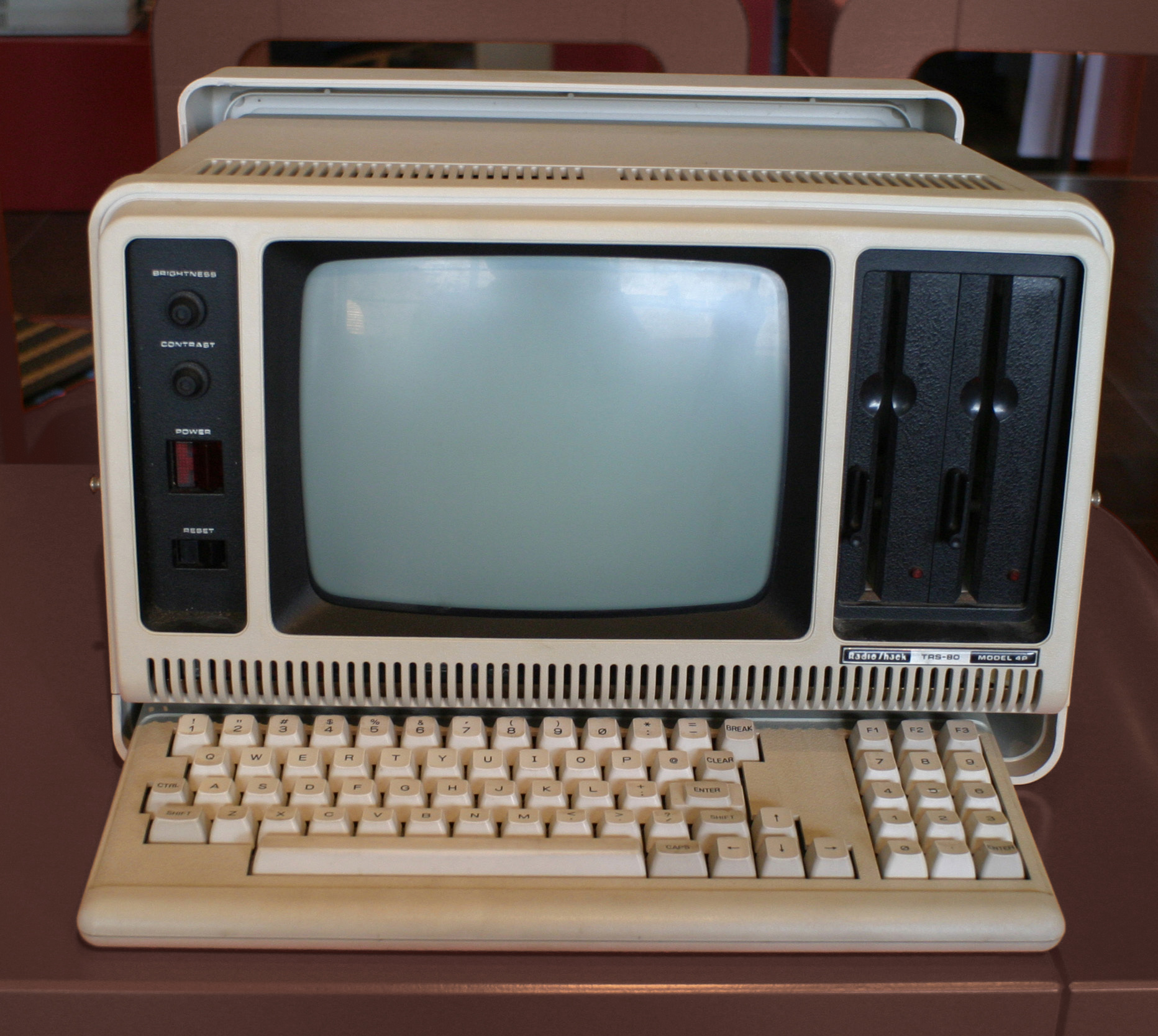
TRS-80 Model 4P

The successor to the Model III was the Model 4. Its microprocessor was a faster Z80A 4 MHz CPU. Disk-based Model 4’s had 64 KB of RAM standard; an optional bank of additional 64 KB was accessible to applications software using bank switching technology.

The Model 4's new hardware features included a larger display screen with 80 columns by 24 rows, inverse video, and an internal audio speaker. Its keyboard had three function keys and a control key. It used an all-new operating system derived from the advanced Model III LDOS 5, licensed from Logical Systems, now christened TRSDOS Version 6. A more modern version of Microsoft's BASIC interpreter more closely resembled the MS-DOS GW-BASIC, featuring PC-like functionality.

The Model 4 could run the industry-standard CP/M operating system without hardware modification (as was needed for the Model III). This afforded the user access to popular application software such as MicroPro's WordStar, Ashton-Tate's dBase II, and Sorcim's SuperCalc. Furthermore, the Model 4 could be booted with any Model III operating system and emulated the Model III with 100 percent compatibility. Prices started from $999 for the diskless version.

Early versions of the Model 4 mainboard were designed to accept a Zilog Z800 16-bit CPU upgrade board to replace the Z80 8-bit CPU but this option was never released, as Zilog failed to bring the new CPU to market.

== Business systems ==
=== Tandy 10 ===
Tandy's first design for the business market was a desk-based computer known as the Tandy 10 Business Computer System, which was released in 1978 but quickly discontinued.

=== TRS-80 Model II and successors ===
==== Model II ====
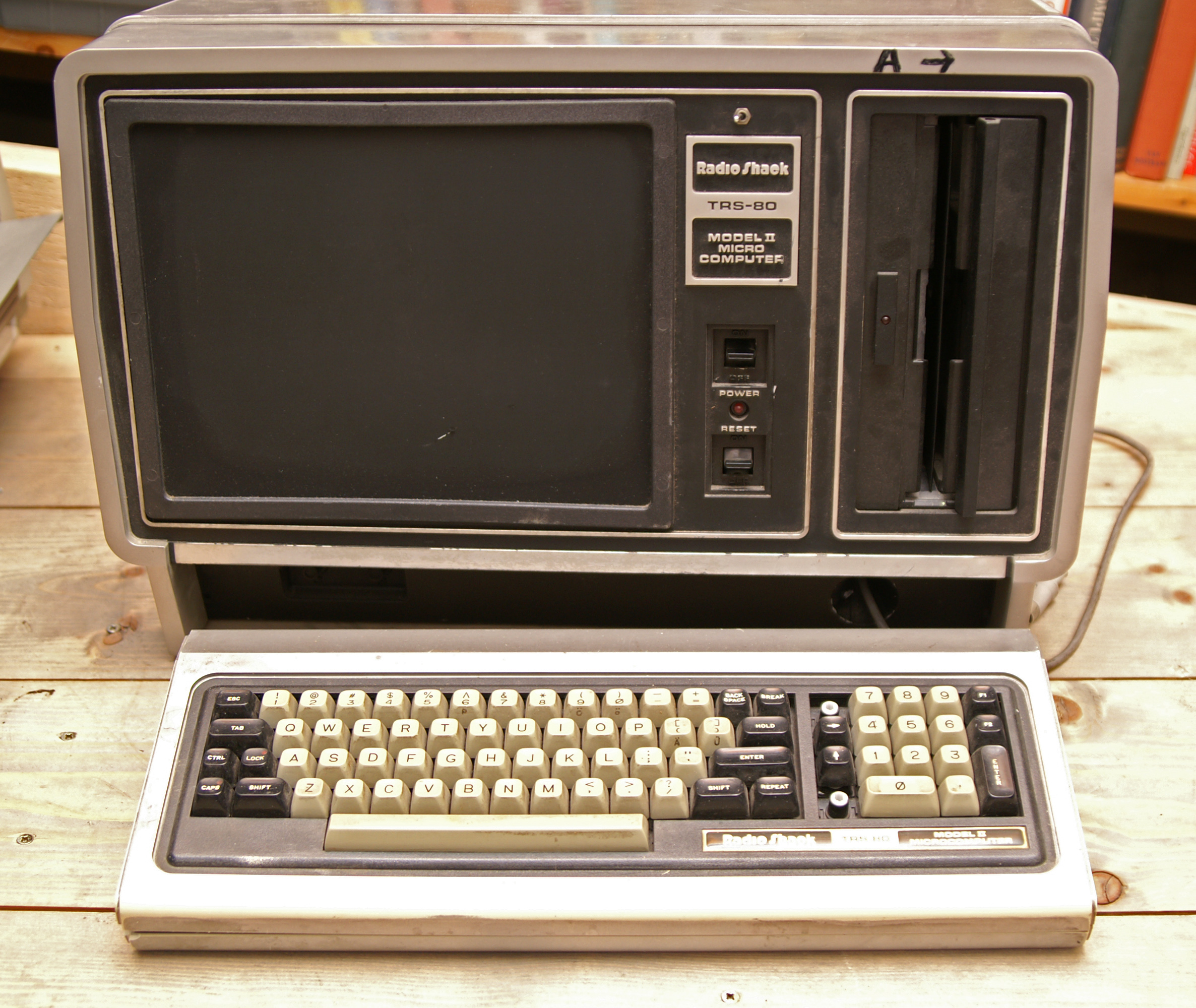
TRS-80 Model II

In October 1979 Tandy began shipping the TRS-80 Model II, which was targeted to the small-business market. It was not an upgrade of the Model I, but an entirely different system with state-of-the-art hardware and numerous features not found in the primitive Model I. The Model II was not compatible with the Model I and never had the same breadth of available software. This was somewhat mitigated by the availability of the CP/M from third parties.

==== Model 12 ====
The Model II was replaced in 1982 by the TRS-80 Model 12. This was essentially a Model 16B (described below) without the Motorola processor, and could be upgraded to a Model 16B.

==== Model 16, Model 16B, and Tandy 6000 ====
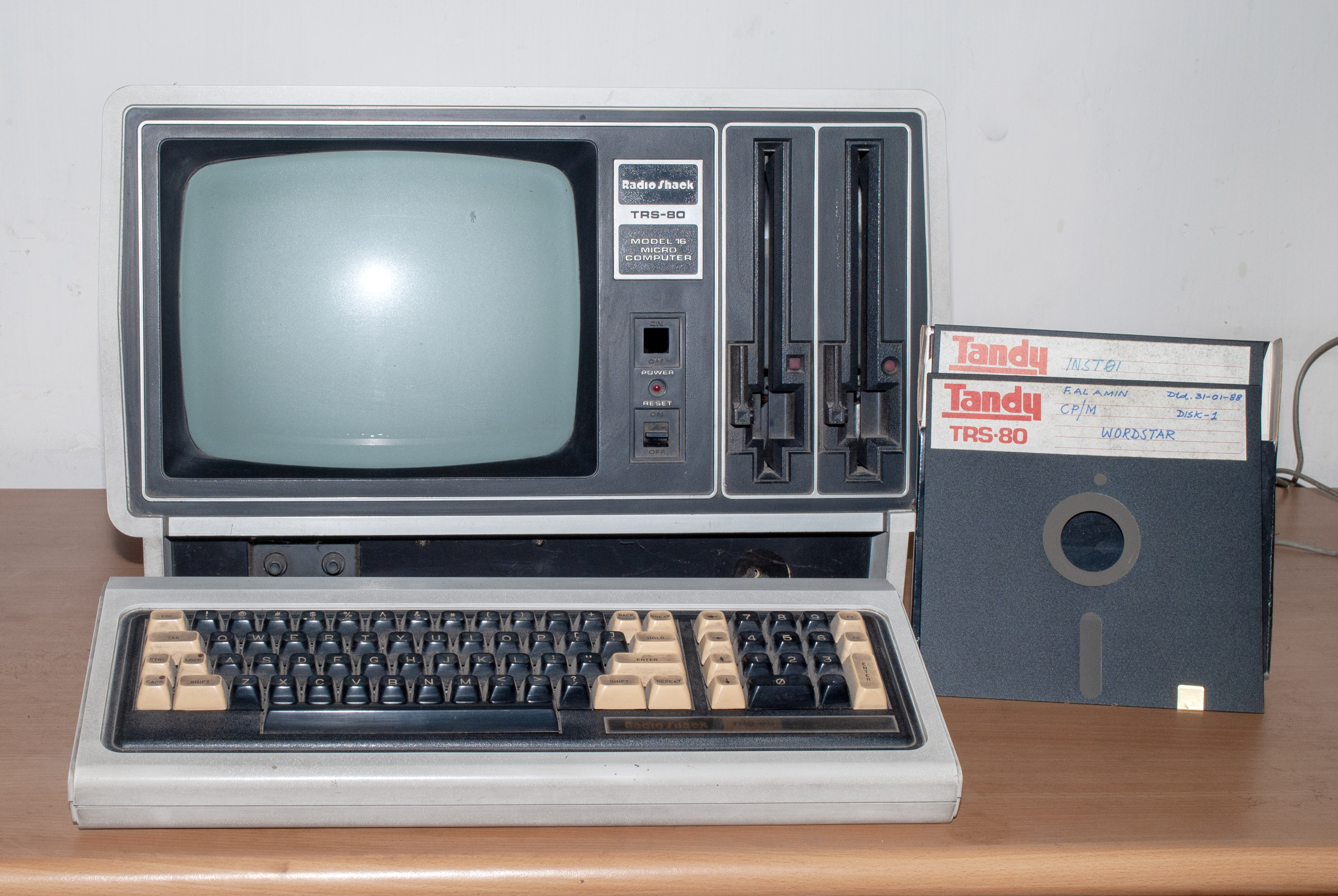
TRS 80 Model 16

In February 1982, Tandy released the TRS-80 Model 16, as the follow-on to the Model II; an upgrade kit was available for Model II systems. The Model 16 adds a 6 MHz, 16-bit Motorola 68000 processor and memory card.

The Model 16 sold poorly at first and was reliant on existing Model II software early on. In early 1983, Tandy switched from TRSDOS-16 to Xenix.

The Model 16 evolved into the Model 16B with 256 KB in July 1983, and later the Tandy 6000, gaining an internal hard drive along the way and switching to an 8 MHz 68000. The 16B was the most popular Unix computer in 1984, with almost 40,000 units sold.

== Other systems ==
=== Color Computers ===
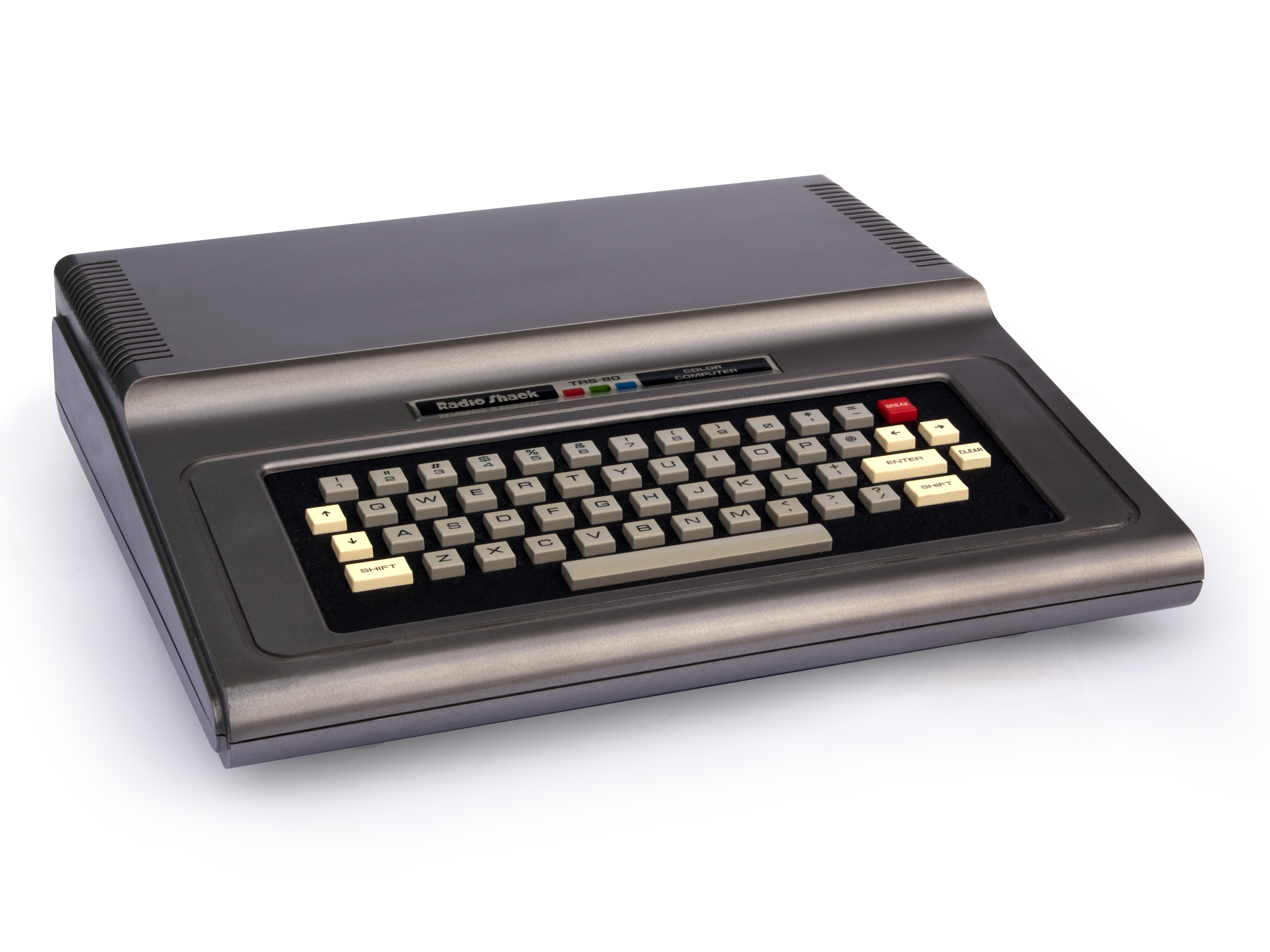
TRS-80 Color Computer 1

Tandy also produced the TRS-80 Color Computer, based on the Motorola 6809 processor. This machine was clearly aimed at the home market, where the Model II and above were sold as business machines. It competed directly with the Commodore 64, Apple II, and Atari 8-bit computers. OS-9, a multitasking, multi-user operating system was supplied for this machine.

=== Model 100 line ===
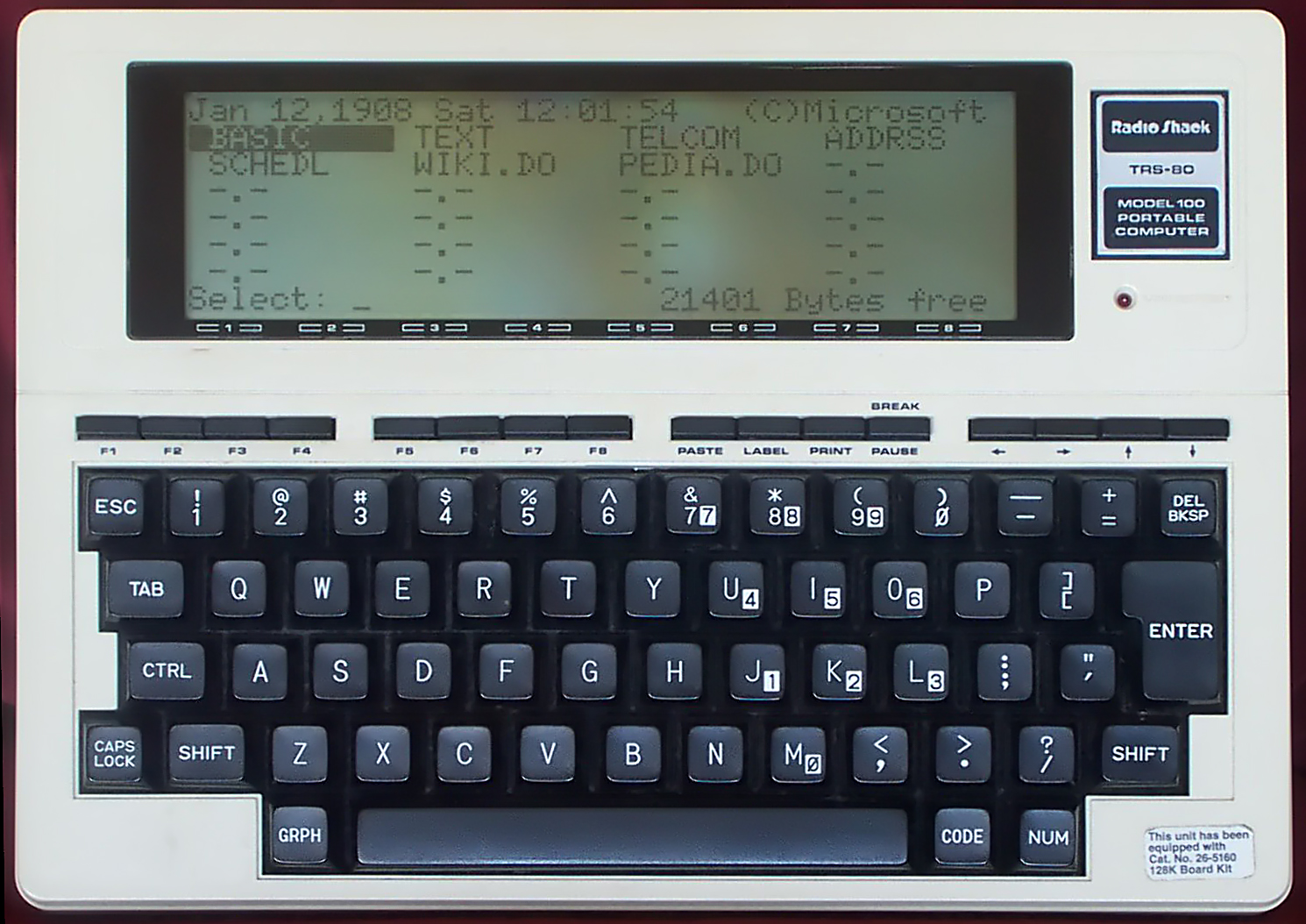
TRS-80 Model 100

In addition to the above, Tandy produced the TRS-80 Model 100 series of laptop computers. This series comprised the TRS-80 Model 100, Tandy 102, Tandy 200 and Tandy 600. The Model 100 was designed by the Japanese company Kyocera with software written by Microsoft. (The Model 100 firmware was the last Microsoft product to which Bill Gates was a major code contributor.) It was also marketed as the Micro Executive Workstation (MEWS).

The Model 100 had an internal 300 baud modem, built-in BASIC, and a limited text editor. It was possible to use the Model 100 with most phones in the world with the use of an optional acoustic coupler that fit over a standard telephone handset. The combination of the acoustic coupler, the machine's outstanding battery life (it could be used for days on a set of 4 AA cells), and its simple text editor made the Model 100/102 popular with journalists in the early 1980s. The Model 100 line also had an optional bar code reader, serial/RS-232 floppy drive and a Cassette interface.

Also available as an option to the Model 100 was an external expansion unit supporting video and a 5 1/4" disk drive, connected via the 40-pin expansion port in the bottom of the unit.

==== Tandy 200 ====
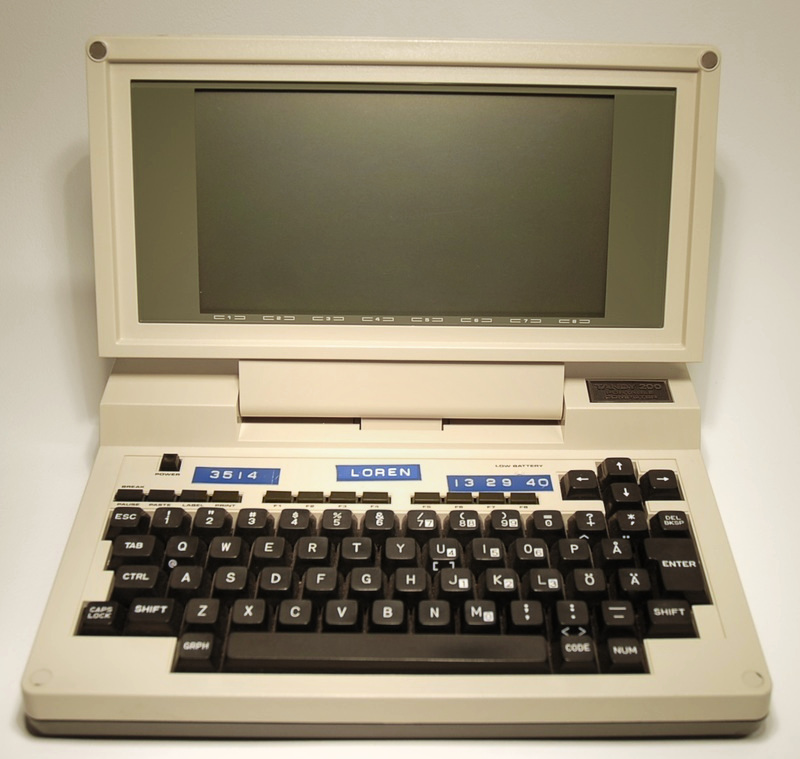
Tandy Model 200

The Tandy 200 was introduced in 1984 as a higher-end complement to the Model 100. The Tandy 200 had 24 KB RAM expandable to 72 KB, a flip-up 16 line by 40 column display, and a spreadsheet (Multiplan) included. The Tandy 200 also included DTMF tone-dialing for the internal modem. Although less popular than the Model 100, the Tandy 200 was also particularly popular with journalists in the late 1980s and early 1990s.

===== Reception =====
InfoWorld in 1985 disapproved of the computer's high cost of accessories ("and you'll find that the Tandy 200 has more accessories than a Barbie doll"), but called it "a big step up from the Model 100 for someone who needs a note-taker or spreadsheet on the run".

=== MC-10 ===
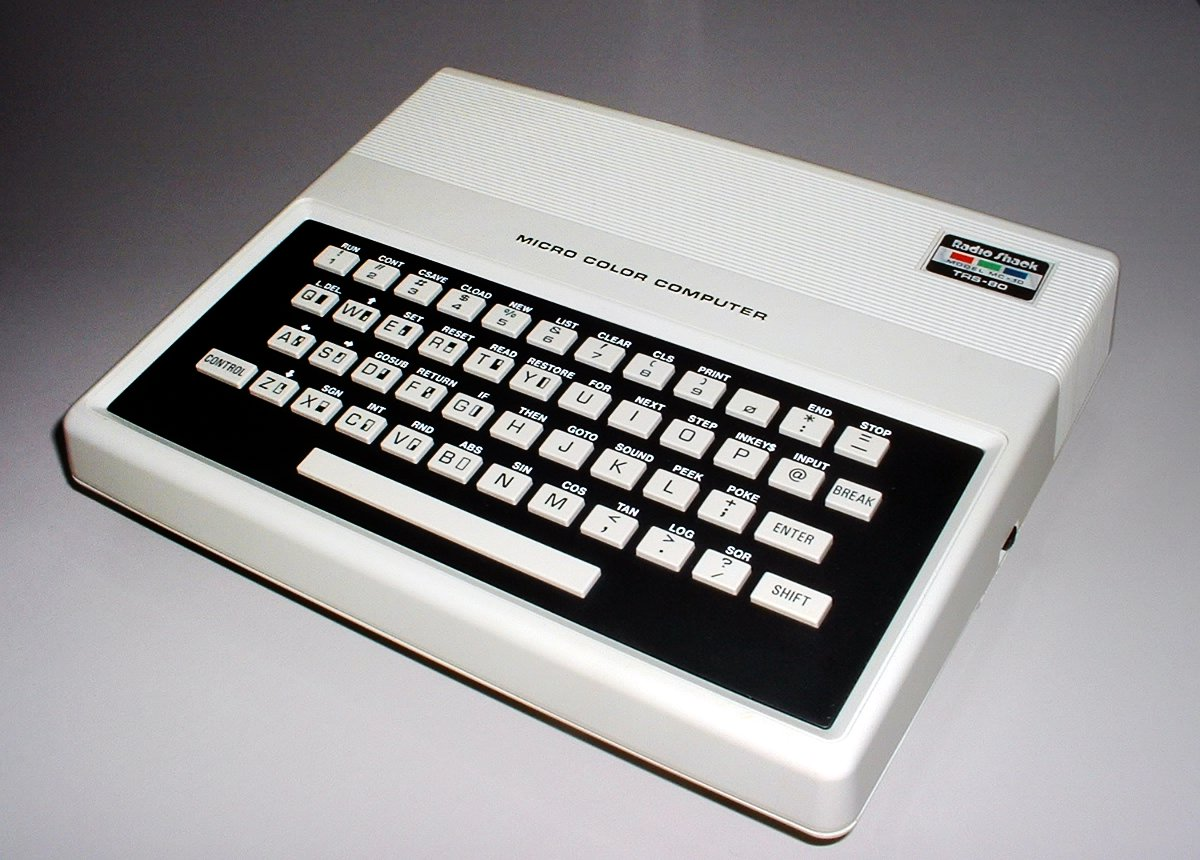
TRS-80 MC-10 Microcomputer

The MC-10 was a short-lived and little-known Tandy computer, similar in appearance to the Sinclair ZX81.

It was a small system based on the Motorola 6803 processor and featured 4 KB of RAM. A 16 KB RAM expansion pack that connected on the back of the unit was offered as an option as was a thermal paper printer. A modified version of the MC-10 was sold in France as the Matra Alice.

Programs loaded using a cassette which worked much better than those for the Sinclair. A magazine was published which offered programs for both the CoCo and MC-10 but very few programs were available for purchase. Programs for the MC-10 were not compatible with the CoCo.

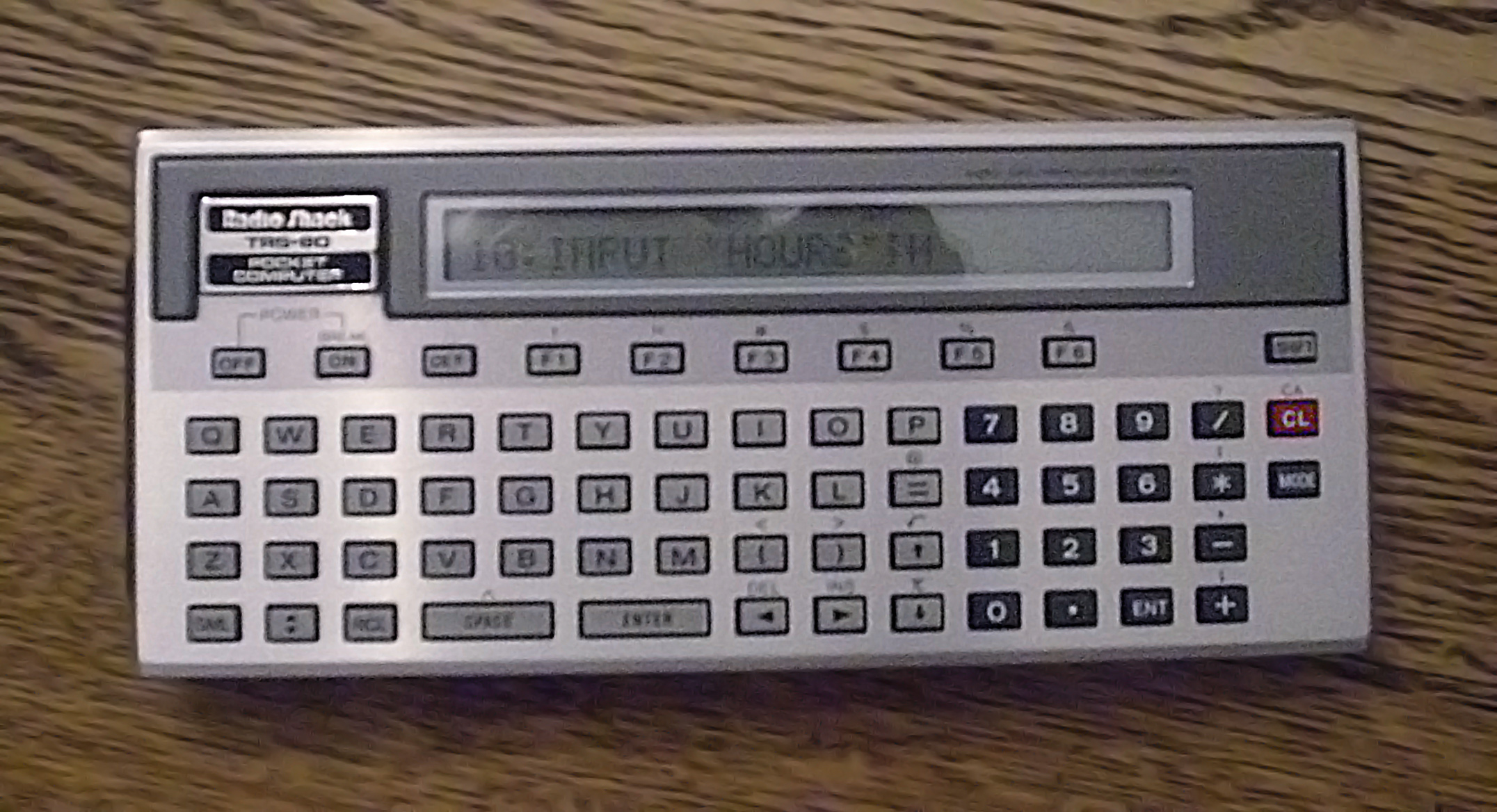
A TRS-80 Pocket Computer (Model: PC-2) ready for use

=== Pocket Computers ===
Both the TRS-80 and Tandy brands were used for a range of "Pocket Computers" sold by Tandy. These were manufactured by Sharp or Casio, depending on the model.

=== Portable Data Terminal ===
The TRS-80 PT-210 Portable Data Terminal was released in late 1982 for US$995 (equivalent to $3,320 in 2025). It included an acoustic coupler, 300 baud modem, thermal printer, and typewriter-style keyboard.

=== PC-compatible computers ===
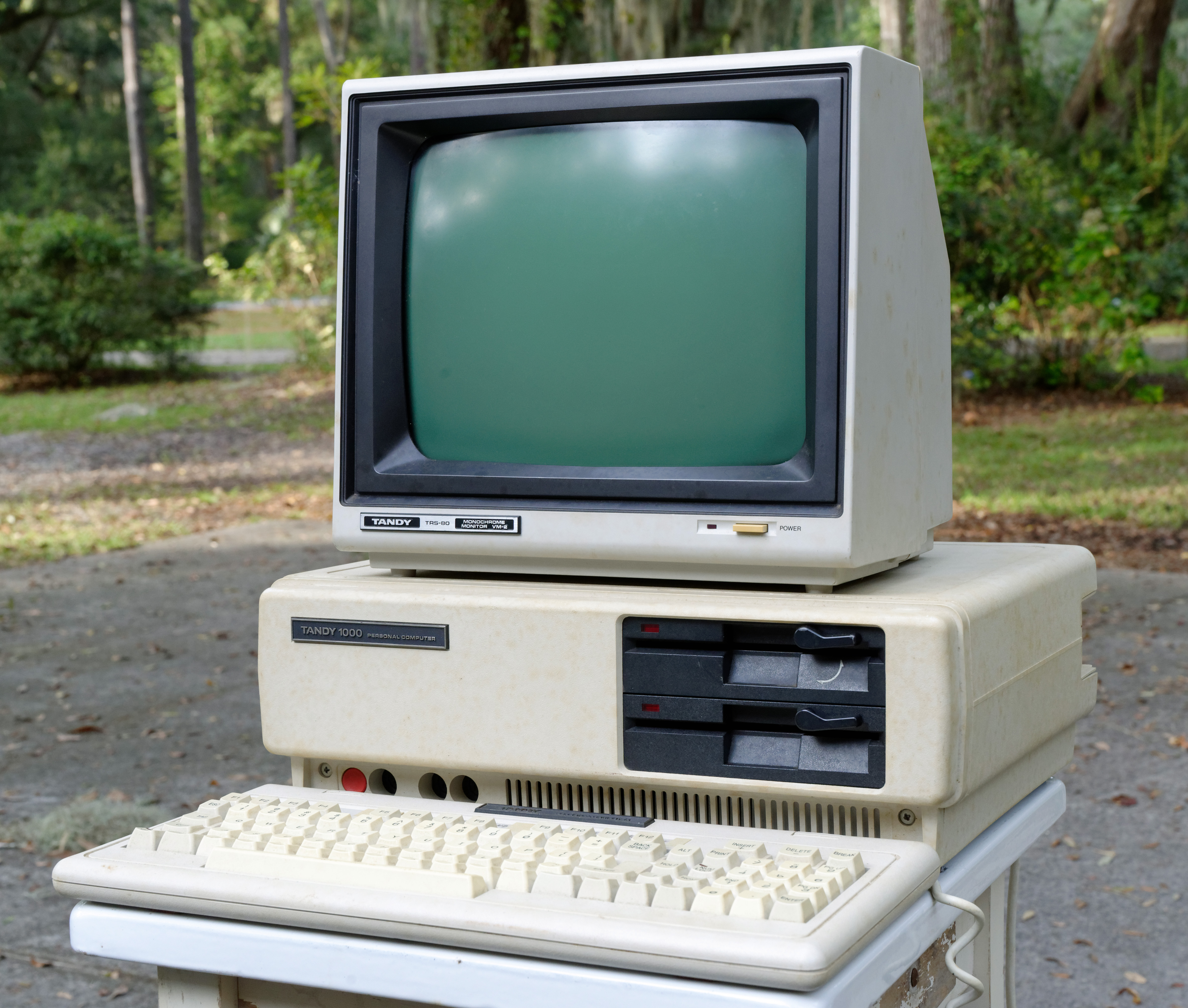
Tandy 1000 computer

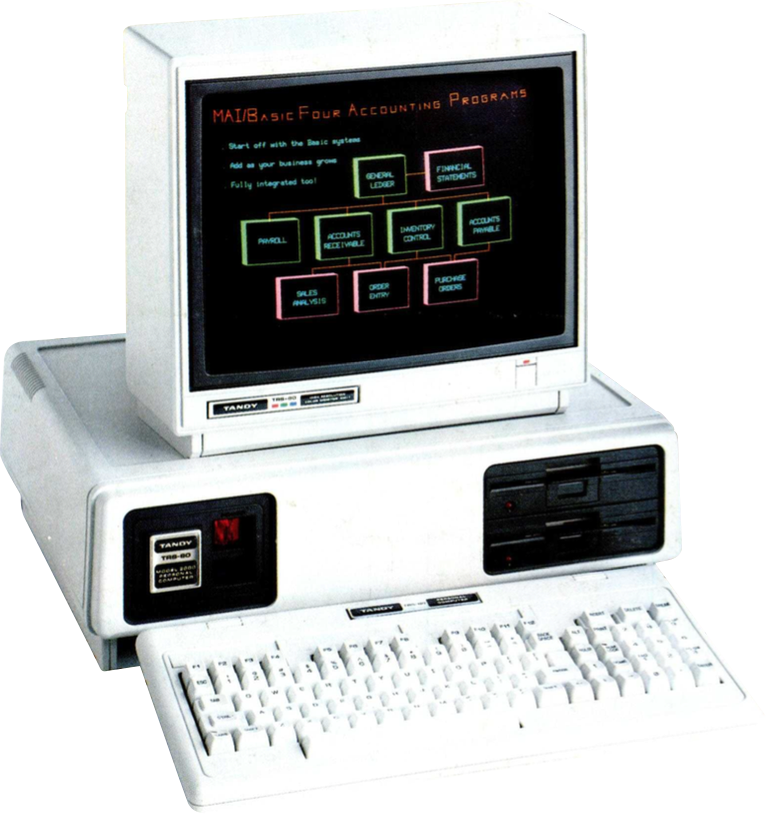
Tandy 2000 computer

In the early 1980s, Tandy began producing a line of computers that were at first "MS-DOS compatible"—able to run MS-DOS and certain applications, but not fully compatible with every nuance of the original IBM PC systems—and later mostly, but not 100%, IBM PC compatible. The first of these was the Tandy 2000, a pure MS-DOS compatible machine with no IBM PC ROM BIOS or pretense of PC hardware compatibility. Such machines were common in the early 1980s; the NEC APC is another example. The Tandy 2000 system was similar to the Texas Instruments Professional Computer in that it offered better graphics, a faster processor (80186) and higher capacity disk drives (80 track double sided 800k 5.25 drives) than the original IBM PC. However, around the time of its introduction, the industry began moving away from MS-DOS compatible computers and towards fully IBM PC compatible clones; later Tandy offerings moved toward full PC hardware compatibility. This industry shift was mainly spurred by the observation that most MS-DOS software was being written for the IBM PC and relied not only on the services provided by MS-DOS itself but also on others provided by the IBM ROM BIOS and, where the services provided by neither DOS nor the IBM BIOS were adequate, on direct low-level control of the IBM PC hardware (especially the video).

The Tandy 2000 was followed later by the less expensive Tandy 1000, marketed as highly compatible with the IBM PC but designed to be an enhanced IBM PCjr-compatible computer. With inopportune timing (for Tandy), IBM discontinued the unsuccessful PCjr shortly before the Tandy 1000 was scheduled for introduction. Despite this unfortunate turn, the Tandy 1000 was well received and was succeeded by dozens of Tandy 1000 models in a very successful and popular line. Each of these models was generally named by adding a two or three-letter designation after "Tandy 1000", such as Tandy 1000 HD, Tandy 1000 HX, or Tandy 1000 RLX. While the progressive Tandy 1000 models fairly quickly departed from PCjr hardware compatibility, they all retained the enhanced CGA video modes of the IBM PCjr (supported by no other IBM or clone machine), and some later models added an original 640x200 16-color video mode.

In 1987 Tandy introduced the 1400 LT, a clamshell-style MS-DOS compatible laptop computer with an integral monochrome LCD and two 3.5 inch diskette drives. A revised model 1400 FD followed, and the model 1400 HD replaced one floppy drive with a 20 megabyte internal hard drive.

In 1988 Tandy introduced the Tandy 5000 MC, the first PS/2 clone on the market, featuring the Micro Channel architecture, an expansion bus technology developed by IBM and—until the 5000 MC—used exclusively on their Personal System/2 (PS/2) line of personal computers.

As margins decreased in PC clones, in the early 1990s Tandy was unable to compete and stopped manufacturing their own systems, instead selling computers manufactured by a variety of companies, AST Research and Gateway 2000 among them.

The later Tandy 1000 systems and follow-ons were also marketed by DEC, as Tandy and DEC had a joint manufacturing agreement.
