= Tandy 2000 =

Personal computer by Radio Shack

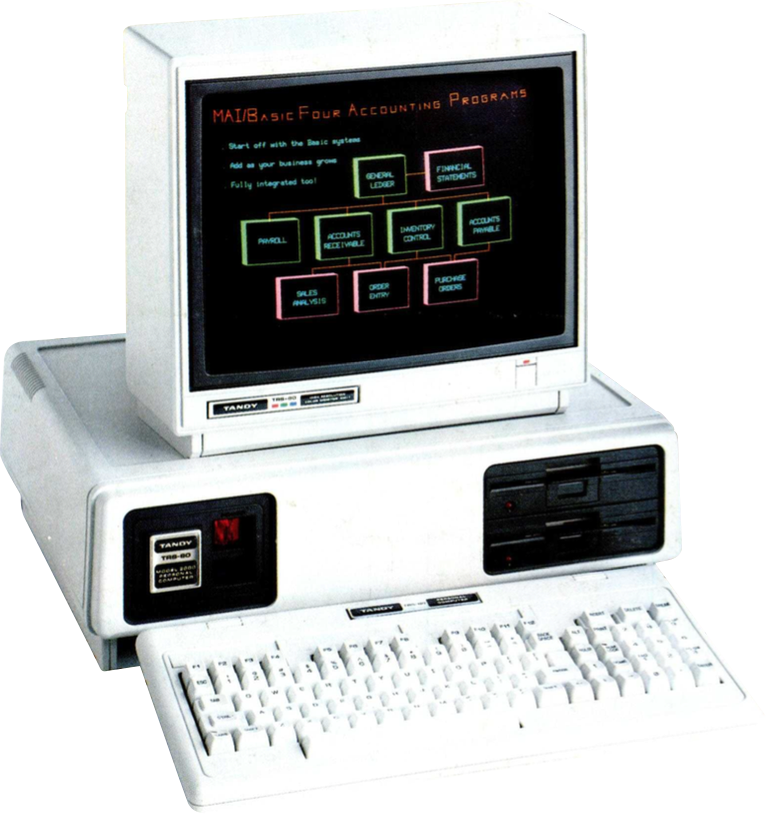
- Type: Personal computer
- Released: November 28, 1983; 42 years ago
- Introductory price: 2000: $2,750 (two floppy drives, 128 KB RAM); 2000HD: $4,250 (floppy drive, 10 MB hard drive, 256 KB RAM); $249 extra for monochrome monitor
- Discontinued: 1988
- Operating system: MS-DOS 2.11.03, Xenix
- CPU: Intel 80186 @ 8 MHz
- Memory: 128–768 KB (896 KB with mods)
- Storage: 10 MB hard drive, one or two 720 KB 5.25-in floppy drives
- Display: Text 25 rows by 80 columns, character matrix in RAM is modifiable
- Graphics: Monochrome 640×400 pixels with intensity bit or eight RGB colors with intensity, 640×400 (both optional)
- Predecessor: TRS-80 Z80-based series
- Successor: Tandy 1000 series

The Tandy 2000 is a personal computer introduced by Radio Shack on November 28, 1983, at COMDEX/Fall'83. It was the company's first computer built around an Intel x86 series microprocessor; previous computers from Radio Shack used the Zilog Z80 and Motorola 6809 CPUs.

The Tandy 2000 was based on the 8 MHz Intel 80186 microprocessor, and could run MS-DOS. By comparison, the IBM PC XT (introduced in March 1983) used the older 4.77 MHz Intel 8088 processor. Due to the 16-bit data bus and more efficient instruction decoding of the 80186, the Tandy 2000 ran significantly faster than other PC compatibles. The IBM PC/AT, introduced later in 1984, used the newer 6 MHz Intel 80286.

While touted as being compatible with the IBM XT, the Tandy 2000 was different enough that most existing PC software that was not purely text-oriented failed to work properly.

The Tandy 2000 and its special version of MS-DOS supports up to 768 KB of RAM, significantly more than the 640 KB limit imposed by the IBM architecture. It uses 80-track double-sided quad-density floppy drives of 720 KB capacity; the IBM standard at the time of the introduction of the Tandy 2000 was only 360 KB.

The Tandy 2000 has both "Tandy" and "TRS-80" logos on its case, marking the start of the phaseout of the "TRS-80" brand.

== History ==
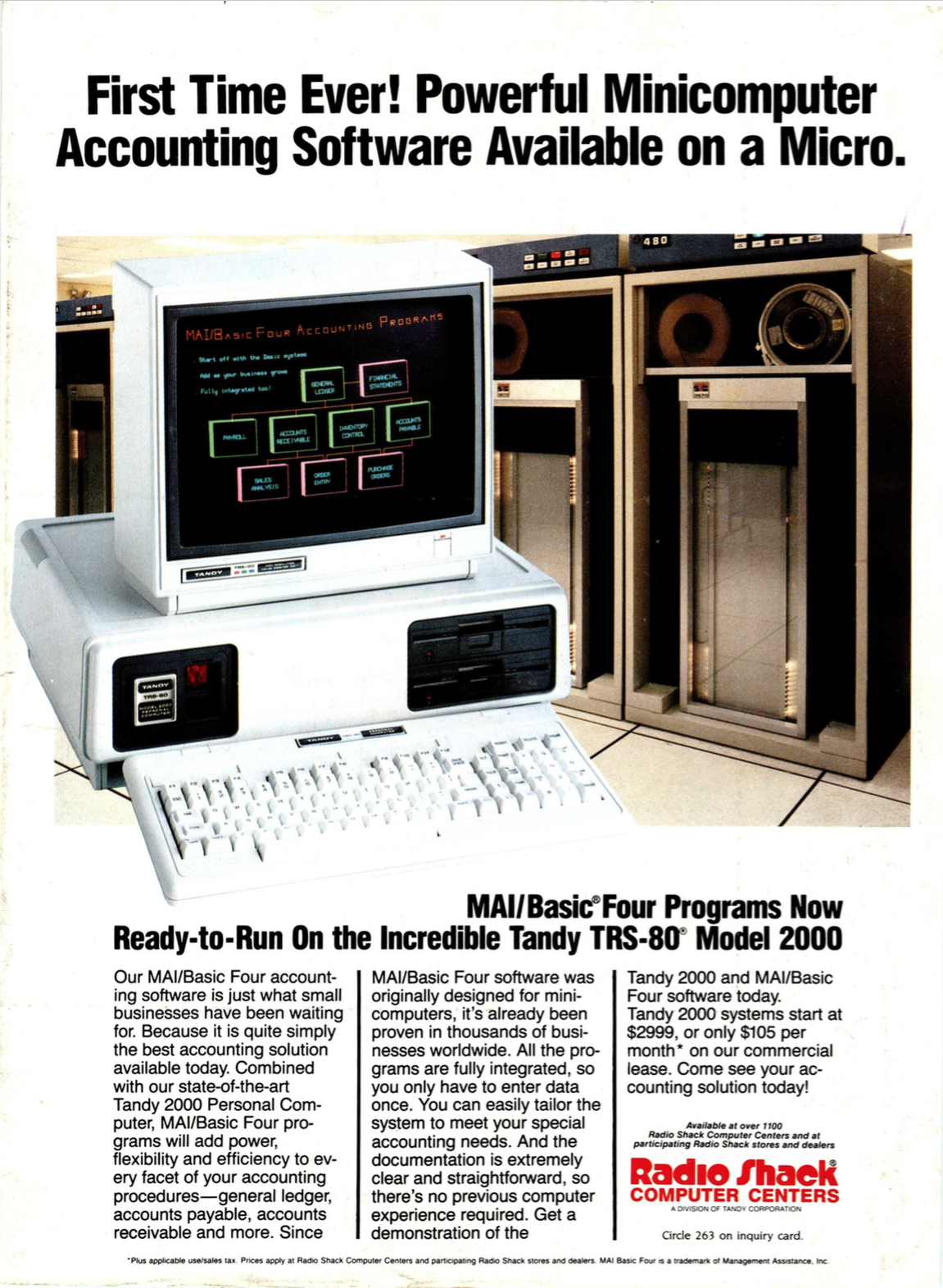
Ad in Byte magazine, July 1984, co-marketing MAI/Basic Four software

By 1983 the IBM PC, and Tandy's discouraging of third-party products, had halved the company's market share and stopped profit growth. Tandy's motive for moving into the new MS-DOS domain was twofold: to capitalize on the new market, and to leverage sales opportunities afforded by their solid position in small computers. Marketing management believed that many Tandy customers would prefer to stay with Tandy products when they made the jump onto the burgeoning IBM/Microsoft bandwagon; it was figured that the company was well-positioned in this regard because of its large base of customers in both the consumer and business markets. Tandy's large presence as a computer retailer, with several thousand Radio Shack stores throughout the US, was deemed an advantage as well. All other PC manufacturers, especially IBM, relied mainly on sales to corporate accounts, not consumer retail as did Tandy/Radio Shack. Thus the company would become the market leader offering affordable 16-bit computers running MS-DOS directly to the computing public.

Therefore, Tandy would have to produce an IBM-style computer running the emerging industry-standard MS-DOS. The new machine would be aimed at the mid-price market between high-end consumers and low-end businesses.

Shortly after IBM's introduction of its 286-based PC/AT, one reviewer remarked, "The bottom line is that the Tandy 2000 is still one of the hottest single-user machines on the market, and a full year after its introduction, its superiority remains unchallenged."

Applications software compatible with the MS-DOS operating system would run properly on the Tandy 2000. This means that the software had to access the computer's hardware (particularly the video display) strictly through calls to the operating system's BIOS. However, programs written to run under the similar PC DOS operating system on an actual IBM PC computer often bypassed calls to the operating system. To function with adequate speed of execution, and to perform operations not provided for by the IBM BIOS, applications programmers often coded their programs to directly address the hardware of the IBM PC. Therefore, any computer such as the Tandy 2000 that had hardware that differed in its details from an IBM PC would not execute programs the same way. Tandy engineers tested one hundred of the most popular PC programs and half were found to be incompatible with the 2000 hardware.

Tandy's marketing department failed to appreciate that similar non-compatible computers from DEC, TI and Eagle were not successful. Tandy described the 2000 as having a "'next generation' true 16-bit CPU", and with "More speed. More disk storage. More expansion" than the IBM PC or "other MS-DOS computers". While admitting in 1984 that many MS-DOS programs did not support the computer, the company stated that "the most popular, sophisticated software on the market" was available, either immediately or "over the next six months".

Two models of Tandy 2000 were introduced: a dual-drive floppy-only model for $2,750 (equivalent to $8,900 in 2025) and the 2000HD with a single floppy drive and a half-height 10 MB hard drive for $4,250 (equivalent to $13,700 in 2025). The dual-floppy model had 128 KB RAM and the hard-drive-equipped 2000HD had 256 KB. (Note: (these prices exclude video monitor; $249 extra for text monochrome)) For comparison, at this time the low-end TRS-80 Model 4 with two floppy drives cost $1,999 and the high-end Model 16 with two floppy drives cost $4,699.

Tandy executive Ed Juge said that within six months Tandy realized that it had erred with the 2000. By early 1985 InfoWorld reported that Tandy introduced the Tandy 1000 because it "found that the market prefers true PC compatibility" to the 2000s incomplete compatibility. The Tandy 2000 received a lukewarm welcome by the market and the computer press because of its inability to run most popular MS-DOS applications. This was not anticipated by Tandy because, at the time, it was accepted practice for new software to be created for each new computer that came to market. Though the company supported the machine with hardware add-ons and software tailored specially for it (including bestsellers like Lotus 1-2-3 Release 1A and AutoCAD), the computer failed to gain popular acceptance and was never developed further. It would not be until late 1986, with the introduction of the Tandy 3000, that Tandy offered a PC-style computer with performance comparable with the Tandy 2000.

The Tandy 2000 was marketed through early 1988 with continual price cuts. Eventually, the remaining unsold computers were converted into Radio Shack store operations terminals.

After Tandy dropped support of the Tandy 2000, a group of users formed the Tandy 2000 Orphans, with software reviews, software and hardware hacks, and a shareware/freeware repository. It was discovered by amateur programmers that many commercial MS-DOS applications needed only minor modifications to function on the Tandy 2000's unique hardware. There was also a BBS based in Texas that had an extensive library of compatible software available for download; neither the BBS nor its web-based descendant is active today.

== Specifications ==
- 8 MHz Intel 80186
- 128 KB RAM (expandable to 256 KB on CPU board with two banks of type 4164 DRAMs)
- One or two 720 KB 5 1/4-inch floppy drives
- 10 MB MFM hard drive (upgradable to two 32 MB hard drives, or two 80 MB drives with ROM modifications and third-party software)
- 8-pin DIN monochrome monitor port
- DB-25 RS-232 serial port
- Proprietary parallel printer port (required adapter cable to connect to a Centronics-port printer)
- Optional 8087 math coprocessor board plugged directly into CPU board

Four card slots on the back could accept expansion boards without any need to open the case, using a rail system. Available expansion boards/cards included:

- 256 KB RAM card (one or two could be added for 768 KB total; each card had two 128 KB banks of nine 64 KB DRAM chips, type 4164)
- Monochrome Graphics Card with optional color graphics expansion (must occupy bottom slot; Tandy monochrome VM-1 or color CM-1 monitor required)
- Serial I/O expansion board providing four RS-232 ports (proprietary driver software required)
- Hard disk controller card with two ribbon cables to an outboard hard drive up to 35 MB capacity
- External 10 MB Disk Cartridge System
- Mouse/Clock controller, including mouse controller and battery-backed real-time clock
- ViaNet Network card (ARCNET BNC)

== Compatibility issues ==
The Tandy 2000 was nominally BIOS-compatible with the IBM XT, so well-behaved DOS software ran on both platforms. However, most DOS software of the time bypassed the operating system and BIOS and directly accessed the hardware (especially video and external ports) to achieve higher performance. This rendered such software incompatible with the Tandy 2000.

=== Graphics ===
The base-model Tandy 2000 supported only a text-mode display in monochrome. The Tandy VM-1 monitor used the 8-pin DIN video port on the computer's rear panel. The text-mode address space was in a different location but third-party memory-resident software hacks remedied this by copying the PC-compatible text-mode memory to the Tandy 2000's text space at a rate of 5–10 times per second. This sometimes caused some choppiness in the display. It produced a fast text display rate—often too fast to read—but the 'HOLD' key on the keyboard could be used to pause text output.

The bit pattern for each text character's raster image was maintained in RAM and could be modified by the user. With clever programming the display's ability to present fine lines provided by the 640x400 screen resolution could be accessed in text mode even without the optional graphics board.

==== Tandy 2000 Graphics Adapter ====
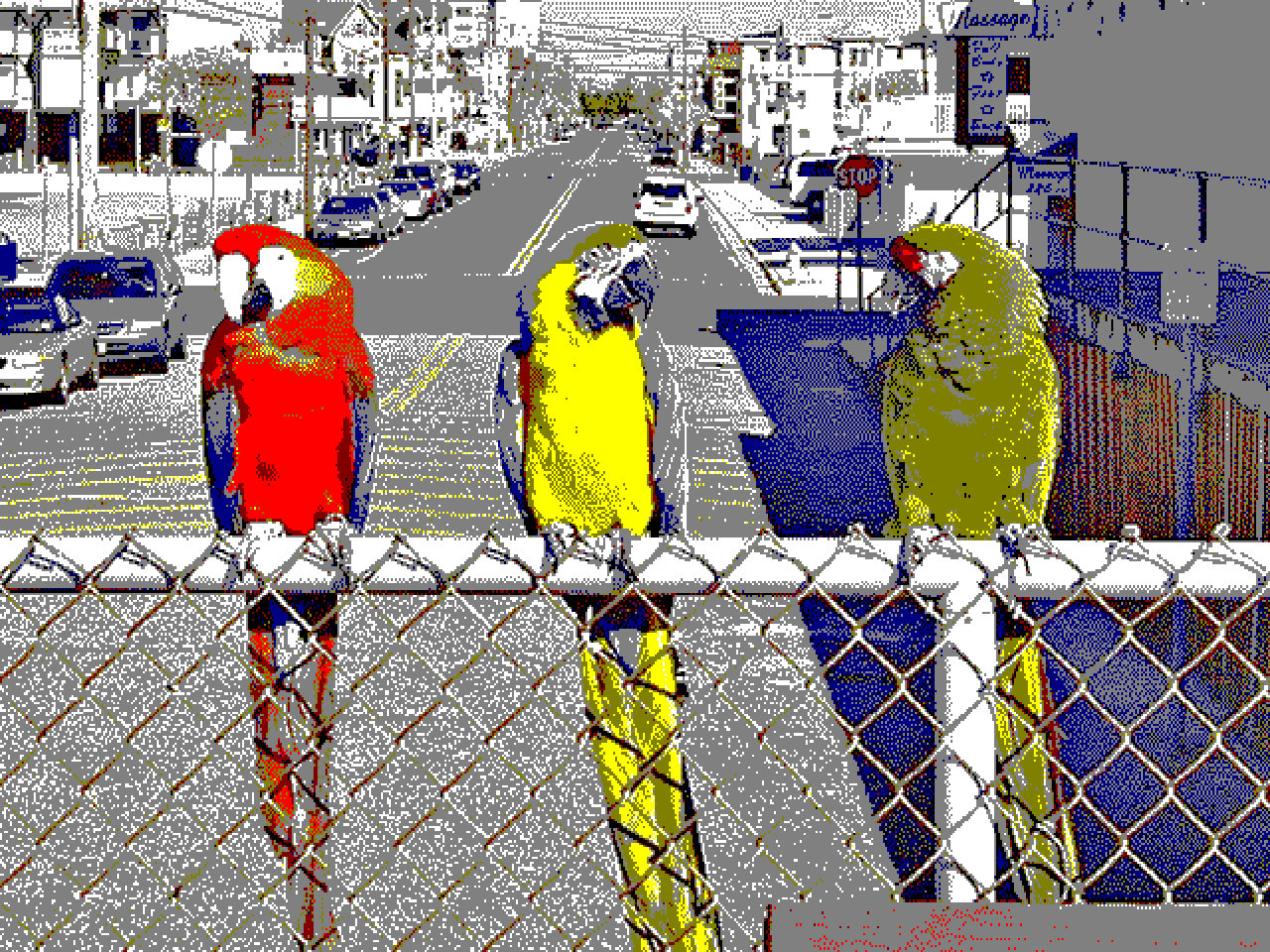
Tandy 2000 Color Graphics Option 640 × 400 x 8 colors

The display was upgradable to support pixel-addressable graphics via the Tandy 2000 Graphics Adapter, a circuit board that fit into an expansion slot. It had its own connector for the monochrome VM-1 monitor; the video connector in the rear-panel cabinet was disabled when this expansion board was installed. The graphics resolution was 640x400 and supported high intensity pixels.

Color capability was provided by the Color Graphics Option, which was a set of chips that were inserted into the empty sockets on the monochrome Graphics Adapter provided for this purpose. (Note: The Color chipset comprises 16 readily-available chips: eight 4416-15 DRAMs, four 74F245s, and four 25LS22 chips. A trace cut on the graphics board was also required.) Resolution for the color board was the same 640x400, non-interlaced, and eight colors out of a palette of sixteen available colors were displayable on the Tandy CM-1 monitor (~$799). This was a particularly high-resolution and colorful display for its day. The CM-1 monitor accepted, as input from the color graphics board, digital RGBI signals (indicating separate Red, Green, and Blue signals with an Intensity bit). CGA compatibility was hit-or-miss.

Tandy 2000 Graphics Adapter Color Graphics Option hardware palette on CM-1 monitor
Color	I	R	G	B	Color	I	R	G	B
Black	0	0	0	0	Black	1	0	0	0
Dark Blue	0	0	0	1	Blue	1	0	0	1
Dark Green	0	0	1	0	Green	1	0	1	0
Dark Cyan	0	0	1	1	Cyan	1	0	1	1
Dark Red	0	1	0	0	Red	1	1	0	0
Dark Magenta	0	1	0	1	Magenta	1	1	0	1
Dark Yellow	0	1	1	0	Yellow	1	1	1	0
Gray	0	1	1	1	White	1	1	1	1

There were only three non-Tandy monitors that worked with the Tandy 2000 graphics card, all of which are long out of production. These were the original (1986–88) Mitsubishi Diamond Scan, and the NEC Multisync and Multisync GS (grayscale). The required horizontal scan frequency for the Tandy 2000 is 26.4 kHz. Modern flat-panel multisync computer monitors cannot sync at frequencies below 30 kHz. The CM-1 monitor is also digital RGB; all modern CRT monitors are analog-only.

=== Media ===
The Tandy 2000 used quad-density 5.25" floppy disks formatted at 720k. This format (80-track disks at the double-density bitrate) was not used by PC-compatibles, although some CP/M machines and the Commodore 8050/8250 drives had them. Normal PCs of the time had 40-track double-density floppy drives and could not read quad-density due to the drive heads being too wide to read the narrower tracks. 1.2 MB 5.25" drives (introduced on the IBM AT) could read quad-density disks because they were 80-track and had thinner heads. Various utility programs for DOS existed that could read nonstandard formats such as the Tandy 2000's disks. Much like 1.2 MB drives, the Tandy 2000 had problems reliably writing 360k PC disks due to the smaller heads not completely erasing the tracks and causing 40-track drives to become confused by residual magnetic signals on the outer edge of the track. Tandy distributed the computer with a utility called PC-Maker that would read and format 40-track disks in the 2000s 80-track drives, and were readable in drives on ordinary PCs.

The floppy controller on the Tandy 2000 is compatible with 3.5" double-density 720 KB floppy drives.

As of May 2019, there is an abandonware site (winworldpc.com) that has available for download a disk image for the latest version of MS-DOS for the Tandy 2000. It includes instructions for using the IBM 1.2 MB 5.25" disk drive (80-track) to create a system disk bootable in the Tandy 2000 5.25" drive. This procedure can also be used to create a bootable 3.5-inch system disk using an ordinary 720 KB 3.5-inch PC drive; this will boot a Tandy 2000 if its 5.25" boot drive has been replaced with a double-density 720 KB 3.5 inch PC drive.

=== Keyboard ===
The keyboard was a new design made for the Tandy 2000. It would later be the same keyboard shipped with the Tandy 1000 and its successors.

The arrangement of the function keys was changed from that of the IBM PC/XT, which had ten on the left side of the keyboard in two columns of five. Tandy was among the first PC manufacturers to change this to the modern arrangement of twelve function keys arranged horizontally across the top. IBM gave a nod to the new standard by using this arrangement for the Model M keyboard.

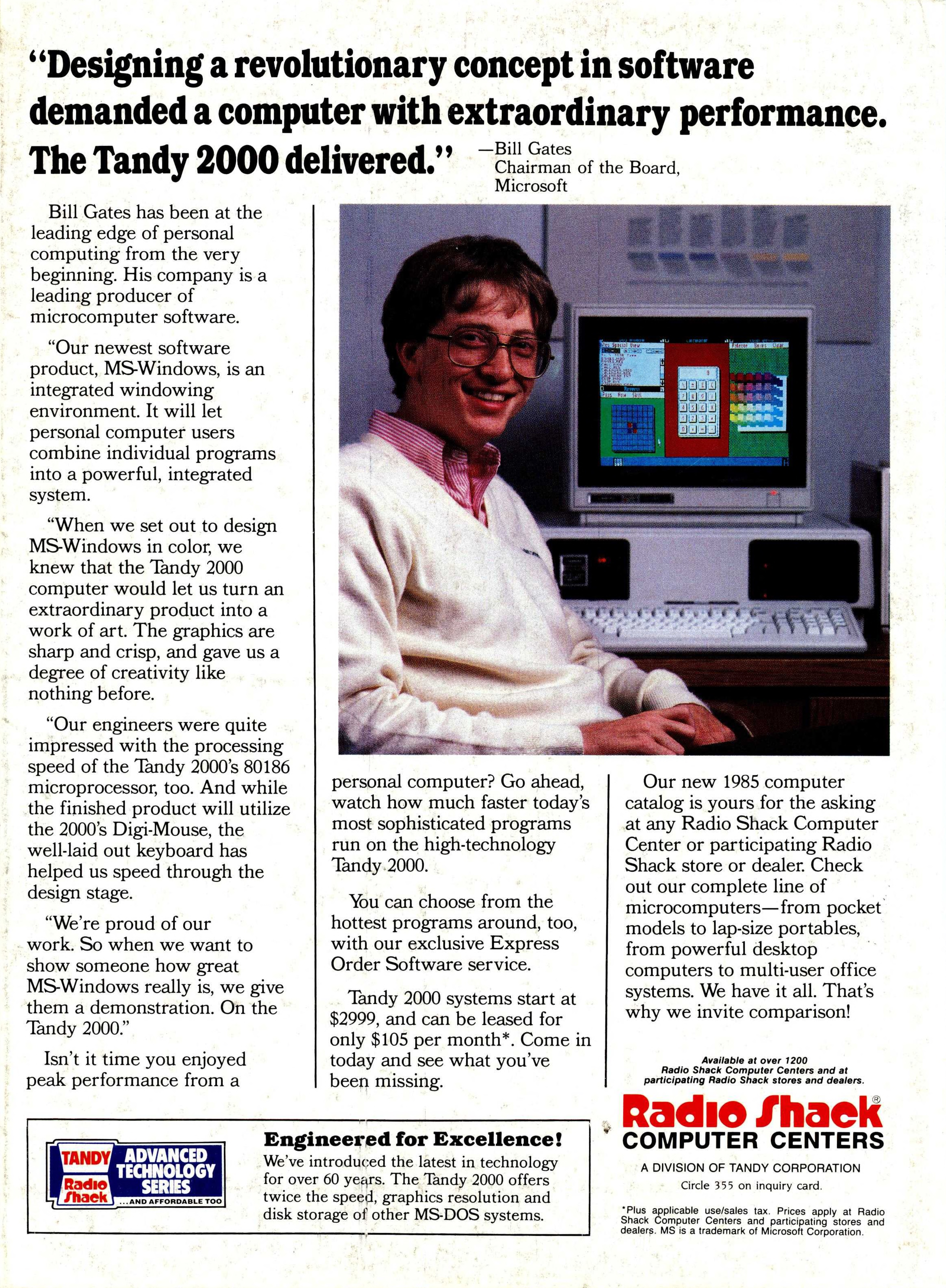
Advertisement from a November 1984 issue of Byte featuring Bill Gates.

=== Serial port ===
The serial port hardware was completely different from the PC/XT's. PC-compatible terminal emulation software had to either access the serial hardware strictly through BIOS or use a FOSSIL driver, a software wrapper that virtualized the serial hardware (see also DEC Rainbow), to run on a wider variety of hardware.

Several terminal programs were available for the Tandy 2000, making it possible to log in on BBSes, e-mail, and other remote systems.

=== Operating system ===
The Tandy 2000 required a specific version of MS-DOS that would run only on this machine. Standard MS-DOS or PC DOS (for generic IBM-compatibles) would not run on a Tandy 2000. It was standard practice and Microsoft's expectation at the time that a customized version of MS-DOS would be prepared for each different machine, with I/O drivers designed for the hardware of that model. The highest version of DOS that Tandy Corporation released for the Tandy 2000 was 2.11.03, with a few minor third-party patches after the fact. A modified version of Windows 1.0 was able to run on the Tandy 2000.

MS-DOS for the Tandy 2000 resided entirely in RAM, unlike on IBM PCs where the BIOS portion of the OS resided in ROM. The complete MS-DOS system (BIOS and BDOS) occupied about 53 KB of RAM. This means that the RAM required to run applications on the Tandy 2000 was a little greater. However, the Tandy 2000 fared better in comparison to the later IBM PC-AT in that the AT was required to run MS-DOS version 3.x in order to operate its 1.2 MB floppy drives and hard drive. Version 3 of MS-DOS was rather larger than Version 2.x running on the Tandy 2000. It also proved advantageous that the Tandy 2000's OS resided entirely in RAM and therefore could be updated and hacked with rather less effort.

The Microsoft BASIC interpreter was supplied with the computer. It was highly customized for the Tandy 2000 hardware, particularly its high-resolution color graphics. Although IBM produced the Enhanced Graphics Adapter a little more than a year later (October 1984), the Microsoft BASIC interpreter would not support its greater color and resolution capabilities until 1988.

Tandy/Radio Shack produced print advertising (seen left) featuring Bill Gates of Microsoft extolling the superior performance of the Tandy 2000 and how it was advantageous in Microsoft's development of Windows 1.0.

== Software ==
Software packages that were released for the Tandy 2000 included WordPerfect 4.2 (WP5.1 could work with software patches), Lotus 1-2-3, Ashton-Tate's Framework, DBase, MultiMate, Pfs:Write, AutoCAD, SCORE, Lumena (from Time Arts) shareware office programs, and the complete line of Microsoft language products. Microsoft released a version of Xenix for the Tandy 2000 (used with Western Digital's ViaNet network card, distributed by Tandy).

Better BASIC for both the Tandy 2000 and the PC was used to write BBS software for the Tandy 2000 and later ported to the IBM PC. Radio Shack's DeskMate was also used with the Tandy 2000 and the Tandy 1000.

MicroPro's WordStar (versions 3.3 and 4.0 only) would run on the Tandy 2000 provided the user ran the WINSTALL installation utility and, when prompted for the type of video display to be used, selected "ROM BIOS". While this would result in a functional installation, none of the T2000's special features would be operative (except for increased speed and storage).

The only version of Lotus 1-2-3 offered for the Tandy 2000 was Release 1A. This was customized to take advantage of the unique hardware of the computer, including its full 768K of RAM, high resolution color graphics, and two extra function keys.

Release 1A's executable code was about 60 KB smaller than the later Release 2, which provided greater macro programming facilities. This extra space for data, with the additional 128 KB of RAM available to a fully expanded Tandy 2000, made it possible to construct larger worksheets than later PCs running Release 2 (until the advent of machines with Expanded memory). For nearly two years following its introduction, the Tandy 2000 was the top performer for processing large models in Lotus 1-2-3.

The Tandy 2000's 720 KB floppy drives were a distinct advantage for running Lotus, because they were large enough to store even the largest worksheets on a single diskette. This is in stark contrast to the IBM PC and XT with 360 KB floppy disks. In order to store the largest worksheets, a PC user would have to split them and save them on two disks—and then recombine them in memory later. Although the XT had a hard drive that could store large Lotus worksheets in a single file, a user could not rely on a single storage device for permanent storage of important data files; again they would be forced to segment worksheets for storage on separate disks. The Tandy 2000's large-capacity floppy disks made backup maintenance relatively effortless.

== See also ==
- Tandy 1000
- Mindset (computer), another PC compatible with enhanced graphics using the 80186
