= Tandy 1000 =

IBM PC compatible home computer system

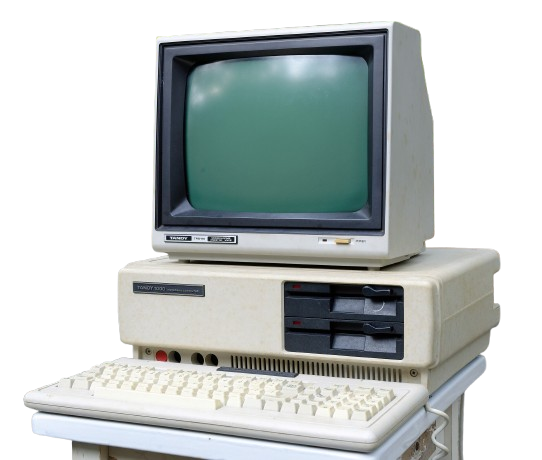
- The original model of the Tandy 1000
- Type: Home computer
- Released: November 1984; 42 years ago
- Introductory price: US$1,200 (equivalent to $3,720 in 2025)
- Discontinued: 1993
- CPU: Intel 8088
- Memory: 128 KB (expandable to 640 KB)
- Graphics: Tandy Graphics Adapter
- Sound: SN76496 or NCR 8496 (PSG)

The Tandy 1000 is a family of IBM PC compatible home computers produced by the Tandy Corporation, and sold primarily through its Radio Shack and Radio Shack Computer Center stores. Introduced in November 1984, the original Tandy 1000 was conceived as a cost-effective alternative to IBM's PCjr, intended to provide an affordable yet capable platform for personal and educational computing. While maintaining compatibility with most IBM PC software, the system incorporated enhanced multimedia features—such as improved graphics, three-voice sound, and built-in joystick ports.

The Tandy 1000 series remained in production until its discontinuation in 1993, coinciding with Tandy's gradual exit from the PC market. Over the course of nearly a decade, the line expanded to include more than a dozen models in various form factors, reflecting ongoing advancements in PC hardware and a gradual transition toward fully standardized IBM-compatible architectures. The series played a prominent role in popularizing multimedia-capable PCs in American households during the mid-to-late 1980s.

== Overview ==
In December 1983, an executive with Tandy Corporation, maker of TRS-80 computers, said about the new IBM PCjr: "I'm sure a lot of people will be coming out with PCjr look-alikes. The market is big." While preparing the Tandy 2000—the company's first MS-DOS computer—for release in November 1983, Tandy began designing the Tandy 1000, code named "August". Unlike the 2000 it would be PC compatible with the IBM PC, and support the PCjr graphics standard.

Released in November 1984, the $1,200 Tandy 1000 offers the same functionality as the PCjr, but with an improved keyboard and better expandability and compatibility. "How could IBM have made that mistake with the PCjr?" an amazed Tandy executive said regarding the IBM chiclet keyboard, and another stated that the 1000 "is what the PCjr should have been".

The Tandy 2000—not completely PC compatible—quickly failed. Since IBM discontinued the PCjr soon after the release of the 1000, Tandy quickly removed mentions of the PCjr in advertising while emphasizing its product's PC compatibility. The company said that it designed the 1000 for compatibility with both PC and PCjr, but emphasized the former when necessary, describing it as "the first fully IBM PC-compatible computer available for less than $1000". The 1000 has joystick ports like the PCjr, and its 16-color graphics and 3-voice sound, but not the PCjr ROM cartridge ports.

Although the press saw the 1000 as former personal-computer leader Tandy admitting that it could no longer focus on proprietary products in a market the IBM PC dominated, the 1000 sold more units in the first month than any other Tandy product and by early 1985 was its best-selling computer. Although the company initially marketed the 1000 as a business computer like the IBM PC, InfoWorld stated in 1985 that Tandy "produced a real home computer". The 1000 helped the company obtain a 9.5% share of the US home-computer market in 1986, a year in which Tandy stated that half of its compatibles were purchased for the home. In 1988 CEO John Roach disagreed with Apple counterpart John Sculley's rejection of the home market: "Let him deny it. He's the only other person that's well-represented in the home market, and if he wants to abandon it, it's all right with me". Tandy also regained a significant share of the Apple-dominated educational market, which the two companies had once equally shared.

The 1000 and its many successors were successful unlike the PCjr. This was partly because it was sold in ubiquitous Radio Shack stores and partly because the computer was less costly, easier to expand, and almost entirely compatible with the IBM PC. Software companies of the era advertised their support for the Tandy platform; 28 of 66 games that Computer Gaming World tested in 1989 supported the Tandy's own graphics mode.

=== Design and architecture ===
Tandy 1000 computers were some of the first IBM PC clones to incorporate a complete set of basic peripherals on the motherboard using proprietary ASICs, the forerunner of the chipset. Although the original Tandy 1000 comes in an IBM PC-like desktop case, some models, notably the 1000 EX and 1000 HX, use home-computer-style cases with the keyboard, motherboard and disk drives in one enclosure. This high level of integration made these machines a cost-effective alternative to larger and more complex IBM PC/XT and PC/AT-type systems, which require multiple add-in cards, often purchased separately, to implement a comparable feature-set to the Tandy 1000.

Being derived from IBM's PCjr architecture, the Tandy 1000 offers several important features that most IBM PC-compatibles of the time lacks, such as the PCjr's sound generator and extended CGA-compatible graphics controller. It also offers multiple built-in I/O ports, including a game port which was frequently a separate add-on card on non-Tandy machines.

The original line is equipped with the Intel 8088 CPU, which was later extended to faster clock speeds and also the 8086, 80286 and toward the end of the line with the RSX, 80386SX processors. Successors to the 1000 appended two or three letters to the name, after a space (e.g. Tandy 1000 EX and Tandy 1000 HX). In a few instances, after these letters a slash was appended, followed by either a number or additional letters (e.g. Tandy 1000 TL/2, Tandy 1000 RL/HD).

=== Retirement ===
By 1993, changes in the market made it increasingly difficult for Tandy Corporation to make a profit on its computer line. Tandy Corporation sold its computer manufacturing business to AST Computers, and all Tandy computer lines were terminated. Radio Shack stores then began selling computers made by other manufacturers, such as IBM and Compaq.

== Reception ==
In an article subtitled "Junior meets his match", John J. Anderson of Creative Computing called the original Tandy 1000 "the machine IBM was too inept, incapable, or afraid to manufacture. It is sure to put a whopping dent not only into PCjr sales, but into sales of the PC 'senior' as well". He favorably mentioned its low price, good PC-software compatibility, and bundled DeskMate ("you might never need another software package for your computer"). 80 Micro approved of the 1000's PC compatibility and stated that the exterior design "gives it a feeling of quality and confidence". The magazine concluded that "Tandy's machine closely emulates the most basic functions of an IBM PC, and it does so at an affordable price ... along with the security of Tandy's substantial support network", but wondered if people would buy the 1000 if IBM lowered the price of the PC.

InfoWorld highlighted the Tandy 1000's affordability, noting that it was "fully one-third less than a comparably equipped IBM PC." The magazine suggested that the computer was primarily aimed at "the elusive home computer market" and speculated that "in retrospect it might have been the PCjr's final straw." Describing the Tandy 1000 as "almost as fully IBM PC compatible as a computer can get," InfoWorld gave a mixed review of the bundled DeskMate software and pointed out the system's limitation in not supporting full-length PC expansion cards. The review concluded that "by making the 1000 inexpensive and adaptable" and including DeskMate, "Tandy produced a real home computer."

BYTE called the 1000 "a good, reasonably priced IBM PC clone that has most of the best features of the IBM PC and PCjr ... at current prices it is a very good alternative". It approved of the 1000's use of the 2000's keyboard, and high level of software compatibility. The magazine stated that DeskMate was "fairly good ... but a little extra programming work could have turned [it] into a much better program", noting that—for example—the word processor did not have a Move command. BYTE also mentioned the computer's short slots. Preferring the Leading Edge Model D among inexpensive computers, PC Magazine also noted the 1000's short slots and criticized its fit and finish ("not even close to the IBM standard"), but acknowledged the low price and bundled hardware features.

== Technical details ==
All Tandy 1000 computers feature built-in video hardware, enhanced sound hardware (based on one of several variants of the Texas Instruments SN76496 sound generator) and several peripheral interfaces, including game ports compatible with those on the TRS-80 Color Computer, an IBM-standard floppy-disk controller supporting two drives, and a parallel printer port, all integrated into the motherboard in addition to the hardware standard on the IBM PC/XT and, in later Tandy 1000 models, PC/AT motherboards.

For the original Tandy 1000, the designers omitted a direct memory access (DMA) controller because the PCjr does not have one, and they believed that those who needed it would add it with additional memory for the computer; they omitted the RS-232 port because all Tandy printers use the parallel port and, they believed, most customers would use internal modems. The earlier models of the Tandy 1000 have a composite video output, and can be used with a color or monochrome composite monitor, or a TV with an RF modulator. The original 1000 and SX has a light-pen port. Unlike most PC clones, several Tandy 1000 computers have MS-DOS built into ROM and can boot in a few seconds. Tandy bundled DeskMate, a graphical suite of consumer-oriented applications, with various Tandy 1000 models.

Early Tandy 1000 models use Phoenix BIOS. Common models of the machine include the Tandy 1000, 1000 EX, 1000 HX, 1000 SX, 1000 TX, 1000 SL, 1000 RL, and 1000 TL. With the exception of the RLX and RSX, the Tandy 1000 machines are XT-class machines, which cannot support extended memory despite some models using 80286 processors. The RLX is an oddity, as it is an XT-class machine that supports 384 KB of extended memory, and the RSX is a fully AT-class machine which can support up to 9 MB of extended memory.

=== Expansion slots ===
With the exception of the 1000 EX and HX, Tandy used industry standard 8-bit XT ISA slots in their desktop models, including the SX, TX, SL, and TL series, but the actual length is limited to 10.5 inches (266.7 mm) or shorter, rather than the industry standard XT length of 13 inches (330.2 mm). While many 8-bit cards meet this length requirement, some cards such as hard cards, EMS memory cards, and multifunction cards that require the standard 13-inch length do not fit in the 1000s case. The EX and HX utilize a PLUS-style connector, which is electronically identical to an 8-bit XT ISA slot, but has a 62-pin pin header instead of a card edge, rendering it incompatible with ISA cards without an adapter. The PLUS connector was designed for compactness in these models with built-in keyboards. The 1000 RSX features two 16-bit AT ISA slots.

=== Hard disk drives ===
As hard disk drives at the time of the Tandy 1000's introduction were very expensive, Tandy 1000 systems are not usually equipped with hard drives. However, it is possible to add a hard drive to most Tandy 1000 computers. Most of the desktop-type Tandy 1000 units can accept regular 8-bit ISA bus MFM, RLL and SCSI controllers like typical XT-class machines; however, care has to be taken when configuring the cards so that they do not cause conflicts with the on-board Tandy-designed peripherals.

For most Tandy 1000 models (other than the compact EX and HX) that do not come equipped with a hard drive, Tandy offered hard disk options in the form of hardcards that are installed in one of the computer's expansion slots and consist of a controller and drive (typically a 3.5-inch MFM or RLL unit with a Western Digital controller) mounted together on a metal bracket. Their own 20 MB hard card was offered for $799, though compatible third-party units were available. Although this arrangement provides a neat physical coupling between the controller and the disk, single-sector internal transfers and dependence on the speed of the host machine to transfer data to memory means that a trial-and-error approach was still needed to set the disk interleave correctly to ensure optimum transfer rates. Furthermore, as the Tandy 1000's slots are only 10.5" long and are 8-bit only, some units do not fit and/or operate correctly unless they are certified to be Tandy-compatible.

Starting with the Tandy 1000 TL/2, XT IDE controllers are integrated onto the motherboard. However, these are incompatible with common AT IDE hard drives. The TL/2, TL/3, RL and RLX all use the XT IDE interface, where the later (and significantly upgraded) RSX is the only Tandy 1000 model computer to use a standard AT IDE interface. One option for modern users of these systems is to install and use XT ISA CompactFlash adapter; this is also the most practical way to install a hard drive into a Tandy 1000 EX or HX, using an adapter cable that adapts the male PLUS-style connector to an 8-bit ISA card-edge slot.

=== I/O and ports ===
Tandy 1000, SX, and TX use a proprietary 8-pin round DIN connector for the keyboard port that is compatible with the older TRS computers but not compatible with the IBM PC/AT or PS/2 standard. Some scan codes differ between the Tandy 1000 and IBM PC/XT and AT, resulting in software compatibility issues. The SL/TL and later use a more directly PC/XT-compatible keyboard protocol, and the 1000 RSX uses a PC/AT and PS/2-compatible protocol.

Tandy 1000 uses a proprietary 6-pin female round connector for the joystick port that on the SX/TX is adjacent to the keyboard port in the front of the computer. It is compatible with Color Computer joysticks, but not compatible with the IBM standard 15-pin male game port. Some DOS games do not work with these joystick ports, but those that support Tandy 1000 graphics and sound work.

Early Tandy 1000 models use the TRS-80 card-edge parallel printer port rather than industry standard DB-25 printer port, requiring a compatible printer cable to connect to a standard printer parallel port. This was later changed to a standard DB-25 connector on the 1000 RL.

Tandy 1000TX and beyond use a proprietary floppy drive cable port, that also powers the floppy drive. It requires a Tandy 1000-compatible floppy drive, though it may be possible to modify a floppy drive cable to make a standard floppy drive work.

=== Operating systems and environments ===
Tandy shipped PCs with their own customized version of MS-DOS, which are compatible with Tandy graphics and keyboard. The most current version of MS-DOS for Tandy 1000 is DOS 3.22. Tandy 1000s came shipped with one of several varieties of DeskMate, the company's own GUI productivity software suite.

There may be compatibility issues with later versions of DOS such as DOS 5 and DOS 6. Until the 1000 RLX, Tandy 1000s are typically limited to 640 KB main memory, and non-Tandy versions of DOS often reduce the memory available for applications and games. In addition, the hardware detection routine for the installer of Microsoft MS-DOS 6 can corrupt the serial EEPROM of Tandy 1000 HX machines.

Tandy 1000s can work with Windows 1.0, 2.0, and 3.0 but not 3.1, with the exception of the RLX which can run Windows 3.1 in Standard mode, and the RSX which fully supports Windows 3.1 in 386 Enhanced mode.

=== Peripherals ===
==== Monitors ====
Tandy offered two color monitors specific for its Tandy 1000 computers: the CM-5, with a 0.64 millimeter dot pitch, and the Tandy CM-11 with a dot pitch of 0.42 mm. Both are 13-inch displays and have a power cable and a nine-pin RGB cable to attach to the Tandy CGA port. The more expensive CM-11 also supports a special proprietary Tandy-enhanced 225 scan line text display mode.

Tandy also offered monochrome monitors that support MDA and Hercules standard that also work with Tandy 1000. As it uses a CGA-compatible interface, non-Tandy monitors that support CGA should work.

==== Keyboard ====
The original Tandy 1000, SX, EX, TX, HX use a proprietary keyboard and keyboard layout that is not compatible with the PC/XT/AT standard. The layout of the keyboard prefigured the IBM Model M keyboard, with function keys arranged in a row at the top, instead of on the left as in the PC and PC XT/AT. Later models of the Tandy 1000 series, such as the 1000 SL, TL, and RL series use a keyboard more similar and compatible with the IBM PS/2 series keyboard connector and layout.

==== Mouse options ====
As the Tandy 1000 uses the same game ports as the Tandy Color Computer series, the 26-3025 Color Mouse and 26-3125 Deluxe Mouse are compatible with the Tandy 1000, though not all DOS software and drivers recognize them. The Tandy Digi-Mouse requires a separate controller that was available in either ISA or PLUS format. Systems with RS-232C serial ports can use standard serial mice, and later systems, such as the 1000 RL, feature a PS/2 mouse connector.

==== Joystick options ====
Radio Shack offered a two-button joystick with its proprietary 6-pin DIN joystick connector that is compatible with the older TRS-80 Color Computer but not standard 15-pin IBM PC game ports often found on sound cards and i/o multifunction ISA cards. It works with many games written to take advantage of Tandy graphics and sound.

==== Light pen ====
The original Tandy 1000 and SX have a DE-9 connector for a light pen. Radio Shack did not manufacture a light pen accessory, but light pens from third-party manufacturers such as Warp Speed and The Lite-Pen Company could be ordered directly from Radio Shack's Tandy Computer Catalog. The Tandy light pen interface suffered from similar limitations to the IBM Color Graphics Adapter, primarily limited horizontal resolution and lack of compatible software.

==== Modem options ====
Radio Shack offered Tandy 1000 PLUS 300 bps PC Modem that is compatible with the 1000EX/HX that used PLUS slots. Radio Shack also offered 2400 bps internal modem. Third party modems with speeds of 14.4k bps should work provided they are eight-bit ISA, and fit.

==== Printers ====
Radio Shack sold the Tandy DMP-130A dot matrix printers to go along with their Tandy 1000 line, along with compatible card-edged printer cable. This printer was sold at home budget prices. Radio Shack often offered a package bundle with a Tandy 1000 computer, CM-5 budget monitor and DMP-130A printer. Using specially designed aftermarket cables, it is possible to connect non-Tandy printers to the system.

==== Apple IIe compatibility ====
Tandy wanted to compete in the education, school and home markets dominated by the Apple IIe. In 1987, the company partnered with Diamond and through Radio Shack sold the Diamond Trackstar 128 series Apple IIe compatibility board for $399, and offered free installation in their Tandy 1000 series. This peripheral is similar to the Apple IIe Card sold later for certain Macintosh models; it is a fully functional Apple IIe clone with 128KB RAM and 6502 CPU and double high-resolution graphics, which allows Tandy 1000 computers to run software written for the Apple IIe and IIc platform. It was also marketed to home users and businesses interested in having both MS-DOS and Apple II compatibility.

The board has a pass-through RGB cable and floppy drive cable, and requires an open 10-inch 8-bit ISA slot, and uses a boot disk to boot into Apple mode. The boot disk has both DOS and Apple software and is copy-protected. Compatibility is fairly good and allows Tandy 1000 owners to run most Apple II software on their Tandy 1000 machine for less than the cost of owning separate IBM PC and Apple II systems.

Many Tandy 1000s sold to schools came with the Diamond Trackstar 128 installed, and home owners also purchased this for compatibility with both DOS and Apple II software.

== System specifications ==
=== Full-size desktop systems ===
	1000/A/HD	1000 SX	1000 TX	1000 SL, SL/2	1000 TL, TL/2	1000 TL/3
Processor	Intel 8088 running at 4.77 MHz	8088 running at 7.16 or 4.77 MHz	Intel 80286 running at 8 or 4.77 MHz: 16-bit memory data path	Intel 8086 running at 8 or 4.77 MHz	Intel 80286 running at 8 or 4.77 MHz	Intel 80286 running at 10 or 5 MHz
RAM	1000/A: 128 KB; HD: 256 KB; All systems expandable to 640KB	384KB minimum; expandable to 640KB	640KB; expandable to 768KB: Memory beyond 640KB reserved for video logic	SL: 384KB; SL/2: 512KB; Both systems expandable to 640KB	640KB; expandable to 768KB: Memory beyond 640KB reserved for video logic	
Video controller	Tandy Video (PCjr and CGA compatible)			Tandy Video II		
Sound chip	Texas Instruments SN76496 (PSG)	Texas Instruments SN76496 or NCR 8496 (PSG)	NCR 8496 (PSG)	Tandy PSSJ (PSG, plus 8-bit ADC/DAC)		
Drive bays	2 x 5.25" half-height			SL: 2 x 5.25" half-height; SL/2: 1 x 3.5" slim-line, 1 x 5.25" half-height	2 x 3.5" slim-line, 1 x 5.25" half-height	
Hard drive	Optional: 1000 HD: 10 or 20 MB	Optional			TL: Optional; TL/2: 20 MB hard drive	20 MB hard drive
Expansion slots	3 x 8-bit PC-XT ISA slots	5 x 8-bit PC-XT ISA slots			TL: 5 x 8-bit PC-XT ISA slots; TL/2: 4 x 8-bit PC-XT ISA slots	4 x 8-bit PC-XT ISA slots
Keyboard	Tandy 2000 derived; non-XT compatible			PC/XT compatible		PC/AT compatible; PS/2 interface
Ports	1 x Card-edge parallel port; 1 x TTL RGB monitor output (DE-9); 1 x Composite video output (RCA jack); 1 x Line-level audio output (RCA jack); 1 x Light pen connector (DE-9); 2 x DIN Color Computer joystick ports (6-pin); 1 x DIN keyboard port (8-pin)		1 x Card-edge parallel port; 1 x TTL RGB monitor output (DE-9); 1 x Composite video output (RCA jack); 1 x Line-level audio output (RCA jack); 1 x RS-232C serial port (DE-9); 2 x DIN Color Computer joystick ports (6-pin); 1 x DIN keyboard port (8-pin); 1 x Headphone jack (1/8" TRS)	1 x Card-edge parallel port; 1 x RS-232C serial port; 1 x TTL RGB monitor output; 1 x Headphone connector; 1 x Microphone connector (switchable to line-level input); 2 x DIN Color Computer joystick ports; 1 x DIN keyboard port		1 x DB25 parallel port; 1 x RS-232C serial port; 1 x TTL RGB monitor output; 1 x Headphone connector; 1 x Microphone connector (switchable to line-level input); 2 x DIN Color Computer joystick ports; 2 x PS/2 ports for keyboard and mouse
Additional features	Reset button		Reset button; Volume control knob			

=== Compact and all-in-one systems ===
	1000 EX	1000 HX	1000 RL, RL/HD	1000 RLX, RLX/HD	1000 RSX, RSX/HD
Processor	Intel 8088-2 running at 7.16 or 4.77 MHz		Intel 8086 running at 9.54 or 4.77 MHz	Intel 80286 running at 10 or 5 MHz	Intel 80386SX running at 25 or 8 MHz
RAM	256 KB minimum; expandable to 640 KB		512 KB, expandable to 768 KB: Memory beyond 640KB is reserved for video logic	RLX: 512 KB, expandable to 1 MB; RLX/HD: 1 MB: 384 KB of extended memory max.	At least 1 MB, expandable to 9 MB
Video controller	Tandy Video (IBM PCjr and CGA compatible)		Tandy Video II	VGA, 256 KB video memory	Super VGA, 256 to 512 KB video memory: AcuMos AVGA2 (Cirrus CL-GD5402) chipset
Sound chip	Texas Instruments SN76496 or NCR 8496 (PSG)	NCR 8496 (PSG)	Tandy PSSJ (PSG, plus 8-bit ADC/DAC)		
Drive bays	1 x 5.25" half-height	2 x 3.5" slim-line	3 x 3.5" slim-line: One bay internal, reserved for hard disk		2 x 3.5" slim-line: One bay internal, reserved for hard disk
Hard drive	Not usually supported		XT-IDE, optional: RL/HD: 20 MB	XT-IDE, optional; typically 20, 30 or 40 MB: RLX/HD: 40 MB	AT-IDE; typically 52 MB (504 MB max.): RSX/HD: 52 MB
Expansion slots	3 x PLUS slots		1 x 8-bit PC/XT ISA slot		2 x 16-bit PC/AT ISA slots
Keyboard	Integrated		PC/XT compatible; PS/2 interface		PC/AT compatible; PS/2 interface
Ports	1 x Card-edge parallel port; 1 x External floppy connector; 1 x TTL RGB monitor output; 1 x Composite video output; 1 x Headphone connector; 2 x DIN Color Computer joystick ports		1 x DB-25 parallel port; 1 x RS-232C serial port; 1 x TTL RGB monitor output; 1 x Headphone connector; 1 x Microphone connector (switchable to line-level input); 2 x DIN Color Computer joystick ports; 2 x PS/2 connectors (keyboard, mouse)	1 x DB-25 parallel port; 1 x RS-232C serial port; 1 x Analog VGA monitor output; 1 x Headphone connector; 1 x Microphone connector (switchable to line-level input); 2 x DIN Color Computer joystick ports; 2 x PS/2 connectors (keyboard, mouse)	1 x DB-25 parallel port; 1 x RS-232C serial port; 1 x Analog VGA monitor output; 1 x Headphone connector; 1 x Microphone connector; 2 x PS/2 connectors (keyboard, mouse)
Additional features	Volume control knob				

== Select models ==
=== Tandy 1000 ===
The original Tandy 1000 is a large computer almost the size of the IBM PC, though with a plastic case over an aluminium lower chassis to reduce weight. It came standard with one internal 5.25" double-density floppy disk drive, with an additional exposed internal bay usable for the installation of a second 5.25" disk drive (available as a kit from Radio Shack). The floppy drives use jumpers to select the drive number instead of the IBM cable twist. The standard memory is 128 KB, with the computer accepting up to 640 KB of total memory with the addition of expansion cards.

MS-DOS 2.11, DeskMate 1.0, and a keyboard with the same layout as the Tandy 2000's are included with the computer. Like the PCjr, the Tandy 1000 motherboard does not supply DMA, but unlike that system, it can have DMA added with a memory expansion board. While the Tandy 1000 has three XT-compatible expansion slots, early Tandy memory upgrade boards take up two of the slots to get to 640 KB. Because the slots are 11 1/2 inches (292.1 mm) in length instead of the PC's 13 inches (330.2 mm), full-length cards do not fit, but reviewers noted that the many built-in hardware features reduce the need for cards.

A later revision of the original Tandy 1000 model is the Tandy 1000A. This revision fixed bugs, scans expansion cards for bootable ROMs, and adds a socket for an Intel 8087 math coprocessor.

=== Tandy 1000 HD ===
The original Tandy 1000 (and many other models), like most home computers sold at the time, does not have a hard disk drive. The Tandy 1000 HD is essentially a Tandy 1000A with a hard disk option factory installed. The factory hard disk has a capacity on the order of 10 or 20 MB.

=== Tandy 1000 SX and TX ===
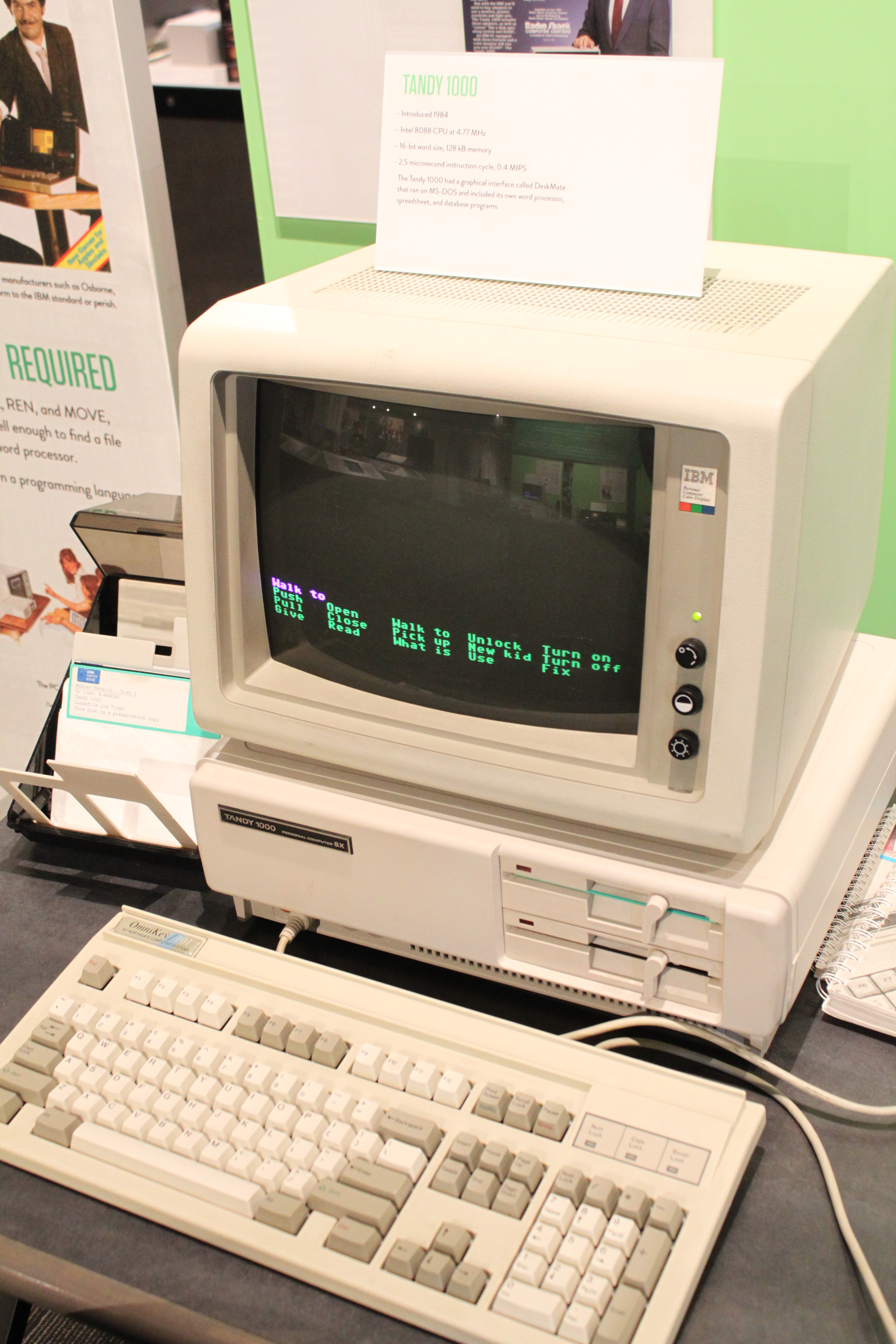
A Tandy 1000 SX with an IBM monitor, running Maniac Mansion

The Tandy 1000 SX and TX are upgraded versions of the original Tandy 1000, utilizing a similar chassis. Two major upgrades over the original Tandy 1000 are the inclusion of a DMA controller, which improved the speed of diskette operations and IBM PC-compatibility of these systems, and the addition of two additional ISA expansion slots, to offer a total of five 8-bit ISA slots.

==== 1000 SX ====
The Tandy 1000 SX uses a 7.16 MHz 8088-2 processor, has 384 KB of memory (upgradeable to 640 KB on the motherboard), comes with either one or two 5.25" internal floppy disk drives, and has the light pen port (not a serial port) like the original Tandy 1000. An adjustable potentiometer inside the system controls the volume of the internal speaker. The Tandy AX is an SX rebadged for sale in Walmart stores. The 1000 SX comes with MS-DOS 3.2 and DeskMate II on 5.25" 360 KB diskettes.

The SX is the first Tandy 1000 in which the built-in video circuitry can be disabled via the installation of an upgraded graphics card, typically an EGA or VGA card, in an expansion slot.

==== 1000 TX ====
The Tandy 1000 TX is similar to the 1000 SX with its detached keyboard, unique parallel port edge connector, and XT-style architecture in a slightly modified case. The major difference is the 80286 CPU clocked at 8 MHz. It features a 16-bit-wide memory bus, although the on-board peripherals and ISA slots are 8 bits wide.

The TX has a 3.5" internal floppy disk drive mounted in a 5.25" bay with room for an optional second internal 3.5" or 5.25" floppy disk drive. The rear panel has the same ports as the 1000 SX, except that an RS-232C serial port replaces the light-pen port. The memory size is 640 KB, with sockets for an additional 128 KB devoted to the onboard video logic. This extra 128 KB can only be used for and by the on-board video controller, so it is impractical to expand the on-board memory beyond 640 KB if a VGA graphics card is installed. The computer comes bundled with Personal DeskMate 2.

The TX is the last 1000-series computer to use DIP switches to store the system configuration parameters. All later 1000s rely on serial EEPROM chips to store configuration settings.

=== Tandy 1000 EX and HX ===
The Tandy 1000 EX and HX were designed as entry-level IBM-compatible personal computers, and marketed as starter systems for people new to computing. They were offered in a compact, all-in-one chassis that features a 7.16 MHz 8088 (capable of clocking down to 4.77 MHz), 256 KB of memory (expandable to 640 KB with a PLUS memory expansion board), PCjr- and CGA-compatible Tandy Video graphics controller, a keyboard and, depending on the model, either a single 5.25" 360 KB floppy drive, or one to two 3.5" 720 KB floppy drives.

An external floppy drive can be connected to a port on the back. The machine itself supplies power to the external drive, so only Tandy's floppy drive unit is usable with the EX and HX. The external drive is the standard 360 KB 5.25" format; in 1988 a 720 KB 3.5" model was offered.

The EX and HX are upgradable via Tandy PLUS cards, and these systems have bays for three cards. A PLUS card connector is electrically identical to an ISA slot connector, but uses a Berg-style 62-pin connector instead of a 62-contact ISA card-edge connector. Other PLUS cards can be installed to add serial ports, a 1200-baud modem, a clock/calendar and bus mouse board, or a proprietary Tandy network interface. Radio Shack later sold an adapter card allowing installation of a PLUS card into a standard ISA slot, such as those in the larger Tandy 1000 models.

Like the original Tandy 1000, the EX and HX do not have a built-in DMA controller, though one can be added using the PLUS memory expansion board.

==== 1000 EX ====
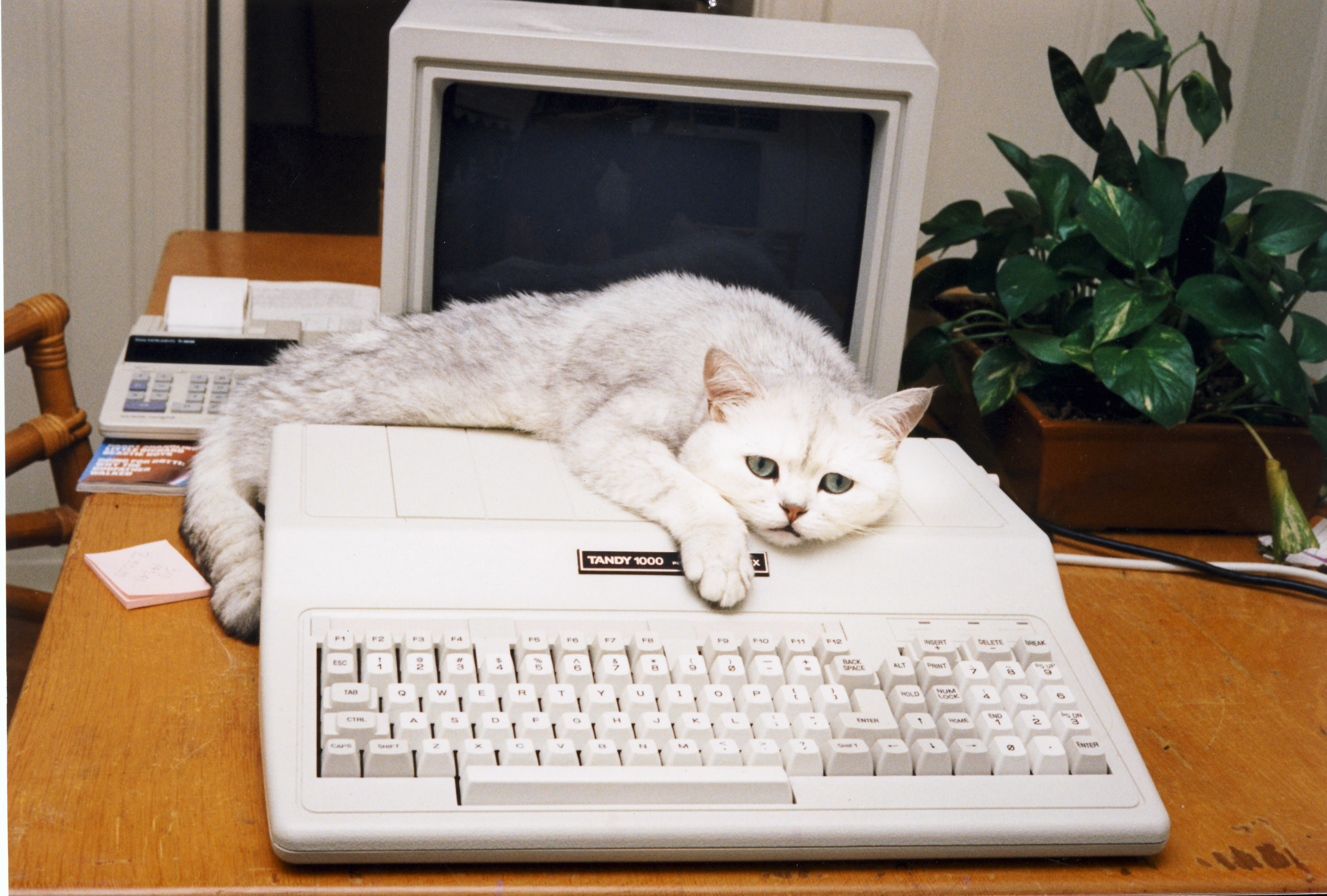
A cat resting on a Tandy 1000 EX computer

The Tandy 1000 EX features a 5.25" floppy drive built into the right-hand side of computer casing. The EX sold for US$1,000 from Radio Shack in December 1986. The EX and, later, the HX were among the most popular of the Tandy 1000 line because of their low price.

A useful feature for the EX and later systems is the ability to boot off either drive, as the drives can be logically swapped when the system booted, so that the drive that was normally drive B: becomes drive A:, and vice versa, and the drives remain swapped until the system is powered off or reset. (The SX and TX have this capability as well.)

The 1000 EX comes with MS-DOS 2.11 and Personal Deskmate on 5.25" 360 KB diskettes. The MS-DOS is a version specialized for and only bootable on the Tandy 1000; it includes a version of BASICA (Microsoft's Advanced GW-BASIC) with support for the enhanced CGA graphics modes (a.k.a. Tandy Graphics or TGA) and three-voice sound hardware of the Tandy 1000.

==== 1000 HX ====
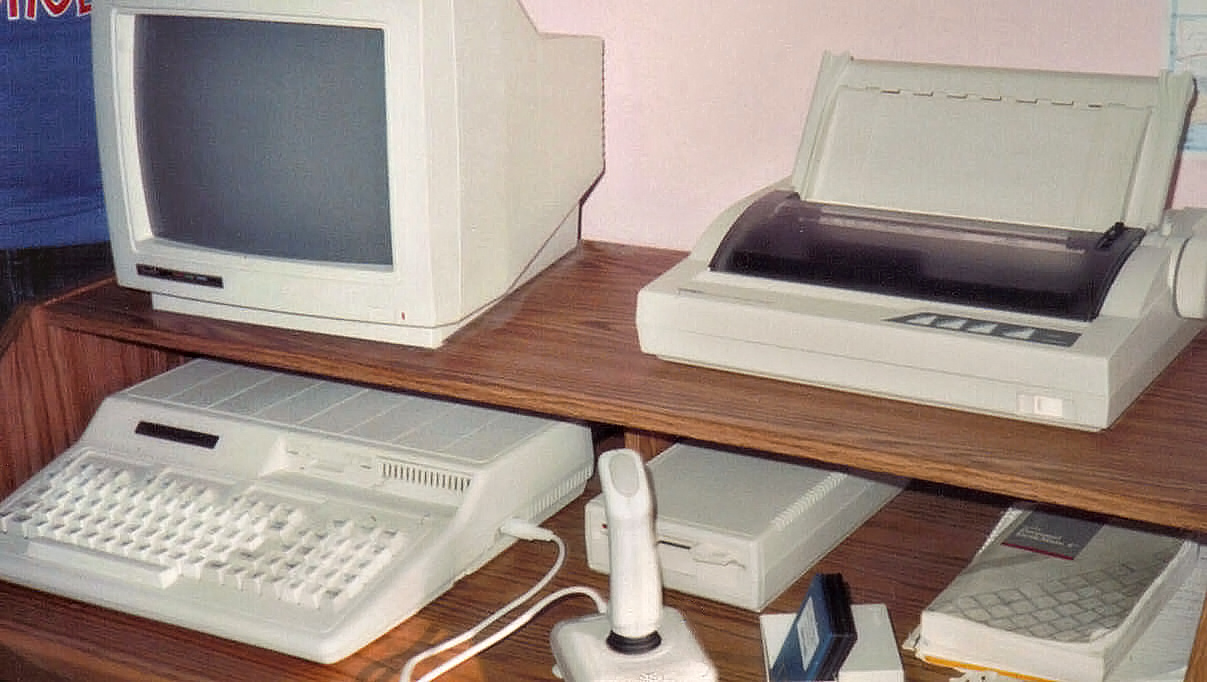
A Tandy 1000 HX, with a Tandy RGB monitor, an external 5.25-inch disk drive, joystick, and a Tandy DMP-133 dot matrix printer

The Tandy 1000 HX is an updated version of the EX, released in 1987. It utilizes the same architecture and PLUS cards as the EX, but with two 3.5" bays on the front panel, occupied by one or two 720 KB 3.5" floppy drives, as opposed to a single side-mounted 5.25" bay and floppy drive. It also has Tandy MS-DOS 2.11R in ROM, which can be accessed by starting the computer with no bootable disk. Another improvement over the EX is the addition of a serial EEPROM to store configuration information, enabling similar functionality to later CMOS NVRAMs. By comparison, earlier Tandy 1000 models, like IBM PC and PC/XT systems, use DIP switches and jumpers for startup configuration settings.

By putting the basic elements of DOS in ROM and eliminating the memory test on startup, the HX boots quickly compared to other contemporary MS-DOS machines, despite having no immediate provisions for a hard disk drive.

In addition to Tandy MS-DOS 2.11R, the HX shipped with Personal Deskmate 2. Most versions of MS-DOS works with the 1000 HX, including DOS 3.x and some later versions; DOS 4.0 is incompatible, and the installer for MS-DOS 6 can corrupt the contents of the serial EEPROM.

=== Tandy 1000 SL and TL series ===
The Tandy SL and TL series of computers are updates of the SX and TX, respectively. In addition to offering redesigned cases, the machines offer a more integrated motherboard with improved graphics and sound capabilities while dropping composite video output. The graphics controller supports 640 × 200 × 16 resolution as well as a Hercules Graphics Card-compatible, 720 × 350 mode for monochrome monitors. Sound capabilities now include an 8-bit monaural DAC/ADC similar in function to parallel port sound devices (such as the Covox Speech Thing and Disney Sound Source) but extended to support DMA transfers, microphone input capability, and sampling rates up to 48 kHz. The SL/TL allow the on-board floppy controller, parallel port and serial ports to be disabled, which the earlier models do not.

The SL and TL were shipped with MS-DOS 3.3 and DeskMate 3 in ROM, and feature a serial EEPROM memory chip to store BIOS settings. The machines can also run generic MS-DOS 3.x, 5.x, and 6.x and Windows 2.x and 3.0 operating systems, although Windows is limited to real-mode operations. In common with many PC clones of the era, MS-DOS 4 is problematic and generally avoided.

==== 1000 SL and SL/2 ====
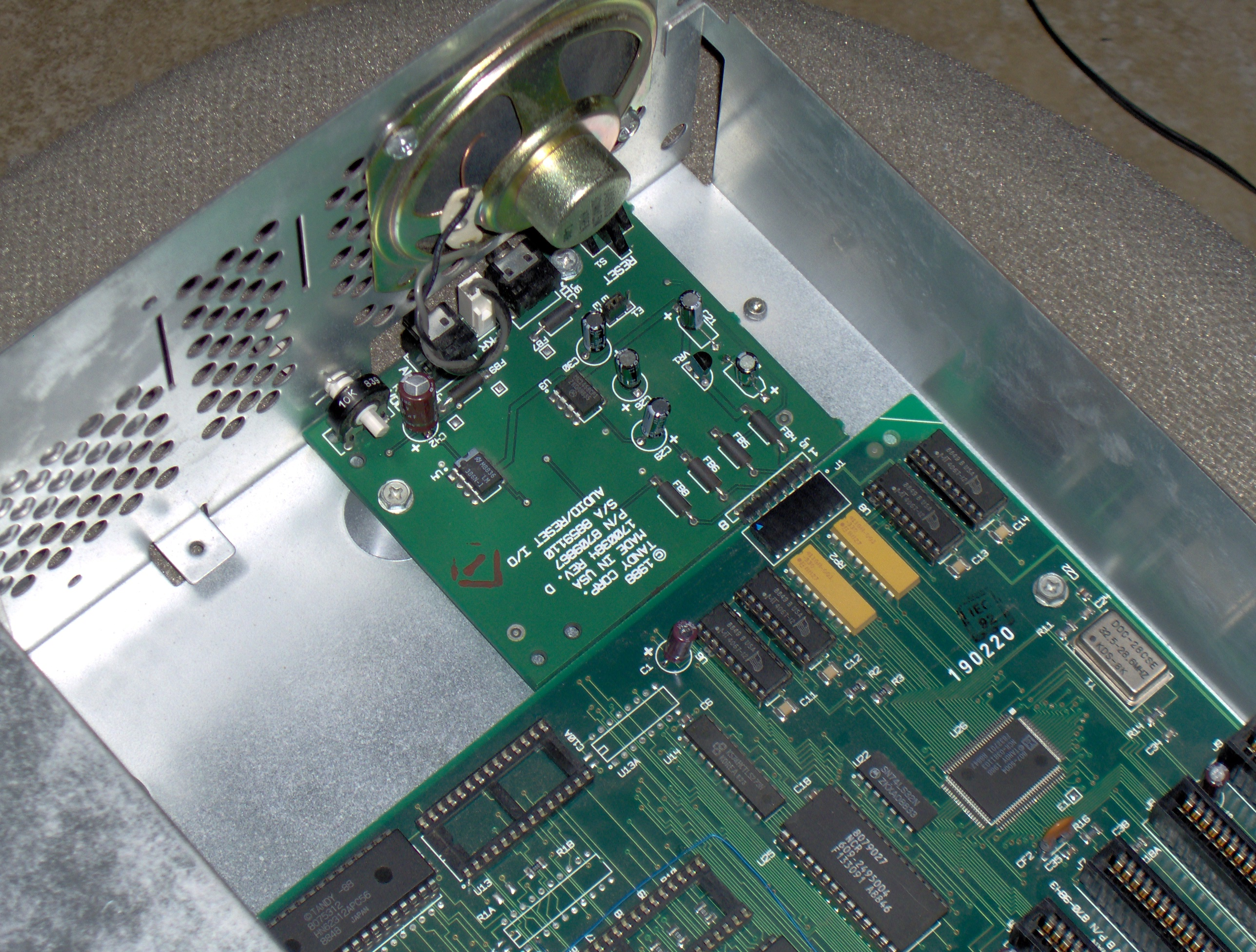
The SL's sound/reset satellite board

The Tandy 1000 SL and SL/2 feature an Intel 8086 processor running at 8 MHz. This is socketed, and thus upgradeable with an NEC V30. The SL comes with 384 KB of RAM preinstalled, whereas the SL/2 offers 512 KB. Both machines can be expanded to 640 KB, although the graphics controller reserves a portion of this memory, yielding only 608 KB to the operating system, even on systems using add-in ISA graphic cards. The SL line has the mic/earphone ports, volume knob, and reset button on a small satellite board. A jumper on the board allows the user to change the microphone input to a line-level output. The SL series offers five 8-bit XT-compatible ISA slots, and does not come with pre-installed real-time clock chips, making them optional upgrades in the form of the plug-in Dallas DS1216E SmartWatch.

The SL is the only machine in the line that offers an upper 5.25" bay, and therefore the only model to offer two 5.25" bays, where the other models, including the SL/2 and the entire TL range, feature two upper 3.5" bays and one lower 5.25" bay. As a result, fitting a hard drive to an SL that already has the upper and lower 5.25" bays populated may require either the removal of one of the devices in those bays, or the installation of a hard disk card-style bracket which seats in one of the ISA slots.

==== 1000 TL, TL/2 and TL/3 ====
The Tandy 1000 TL and TL/2 uses 8 MHz Intel 80286 processors, whereas the TL/3 uses a 10 MHz 80286. The TLs has 640 KB of memory preinstalled, with an option for an extra 128 KB for video frame buffering just as in the 1000 TX. Unlike the SL series machines, the TL series comes with the SmartWatch real-time clock logic built-in, which is powered by a removable 3-volt CR2032 button-cell battery on the motherboard.

The TL offers five 8-bit XT-compatible ISA slots, while the TL/2 and TL/3 offer four slots and an on-board 8-bit, XT IDE-compatible hard disk interface, which is not compatible with standard AT IDE hard drives. The TL series offers two upper 3.5" bays and one lower 5.25" bay, and the TL/3 has a high-density floppy drive controller for 1.44 MB drives, though it comes with a double-density 3.5" 720 KB drive.

As the processors on the TL-series are socketed, it is possible to install 386SX or Cyrix 486SLC-based processor upgrades, though the benefit of installing more advanced processors is limited beyond merely providing a speed increase due to the computers' XT-based architecture, and their resulting inability to access extended memory above 1 MB.

=== Tandy 1000 RL-series and RSX ===
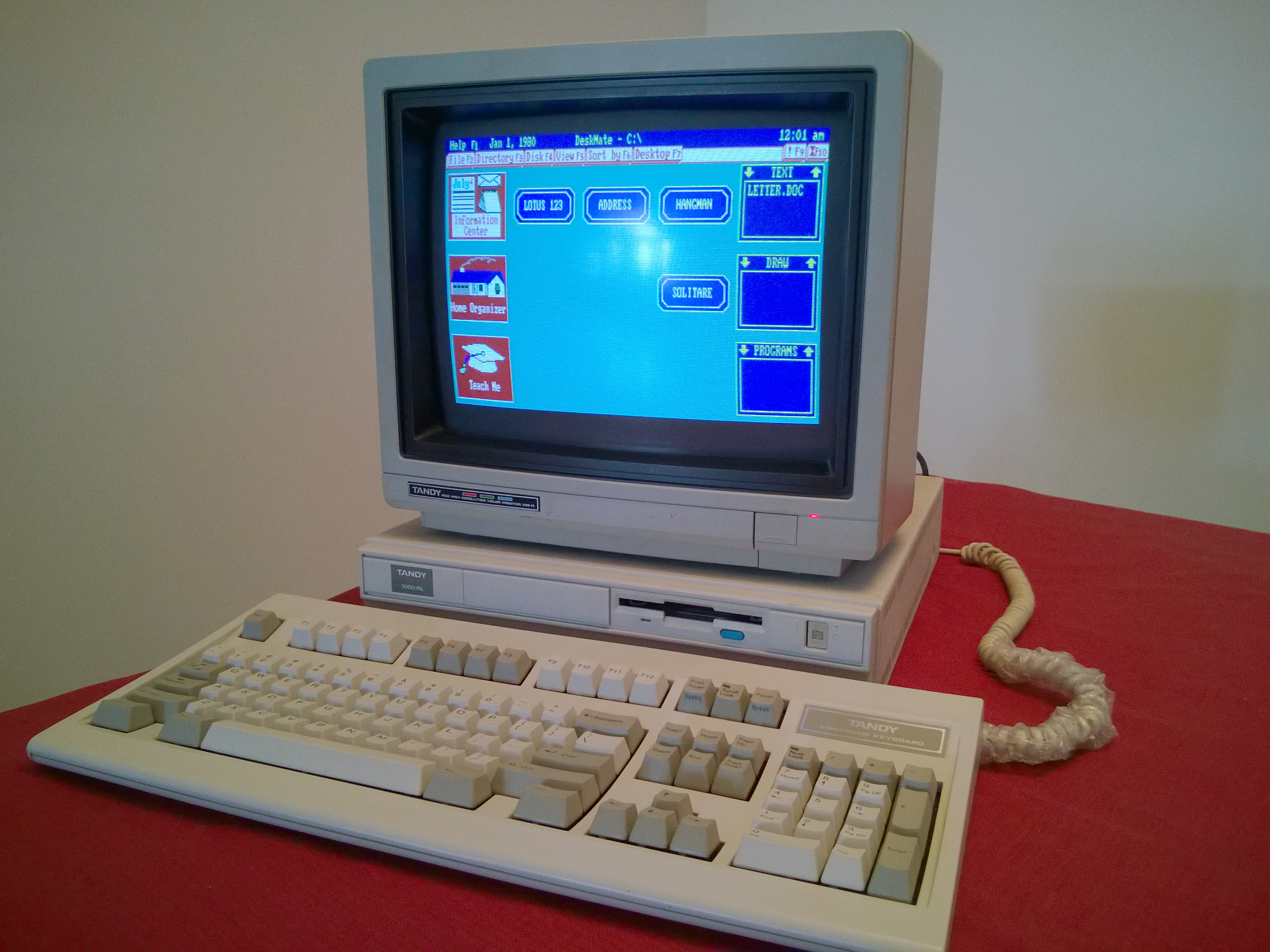
A Tandy 1000 RL running DeskMate (optional mouse not shown)

The Tandy 1000 RL/RLX/RSX are slim-line desktop home computers. They have a much more compact case, with at least 512 KB of memory pre-installed, smaller PS/2-style keyboard and mouse ports, and at least one ISA expansion slot. The RL-series and RSX include provisions for an internal hard disk drive, depending on the model: the RL-series features a built-in XT-IDE hard drive interface, while the RSX features an AT-compatible IDE interface. The keyboard connectors of the RL-series, while similar to and mechanically compatible with PS/2-style connectors, are not fully compatible with typical PS/2 keyboards, as the keyboard uses the XT keyboard protocol. The RSX, however, incorporates the AT keyboard protocol, making it the first 1000-series system to offer more complete compatibility with typical PS/2 keyboards, and AT keyboards using an adapter.

==== 1000 RL and RL/HD ====
The RL and RL/HD features a surface-mounted 9.54 MHz 8086 processor, 512 KB of RAM (expandable to 768 KB to provide 128 KB for video and 640 KB conventional memory), a DB-25 unidirectional parallel port instead of the edge-connector ports, and the SL's enhanced graphics and sound. A single half-size 8-bit expansion slot is available. The RL/HD has a battery-backed real-time clock chip to store date and time information. The RL lacks this and requires a plug-in Smartwatch chip. These models also have MS-DOS and a portion of DeskMate in ROM, and can therefore boot much faster than many other computers on the market. The RL/HD comes with a 20MB drive preinstalled.

==== 1000 RLX ====
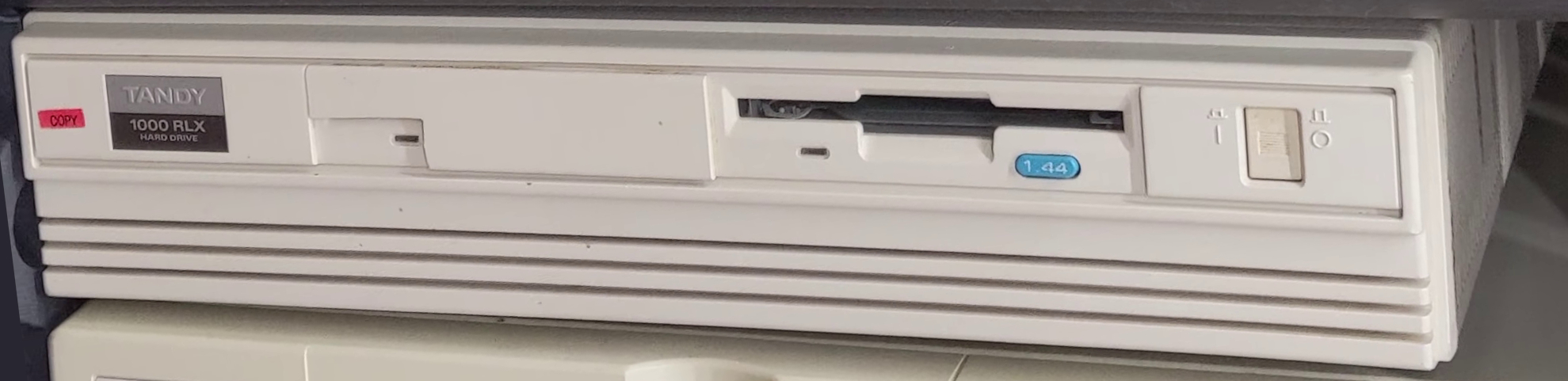
Front view of a Tandy 1000 RLX

The RLX is the 'mid-range' offering of the RL line. It has a 10 MHz 286 (surface-mounted) and 512 KB of RAM, and unlike other 286-based Tandy 1000 models, it supports 384 KB of extended memory when RAM is expanded to the maximum 1 MB. However, it is not a full AT-class machine, as it still has an 8-bit ISA bus (as with the RL, one half-size expansion slot) and only 8 IRQs and 4 DMA channels. While the three-voice sound chip and DAC are still present, Tandy video was dropped in favor of an AcuMos VGA controller offering 256 KB of video memory and standard VGA graphics resolutions. The parallel port is bidirectional, a first for the Tandy 1000 series. The RLX has one 1.44 MB 3.5" floppy drive; an empty drive bay can host a second such drive. The hard disk RLX/HD comes with a 20 MB hard disk and 1 MB RAM preinstalled. The hard disk occupies the empty drive bay, so this version supports only a single floppy drive.

==== 1000 RSX ====
A more upscale offering, the RSX offers a 25 MHz 80386SX processor, 1 MB RAM, two 16-bit ISA slots, AcuMos SVGA video, a bidirectional parallel port, and standard PS/2 keyboard and mouse ports. It is a full 386-class PC and can run Microsoft Windows 3.x. Two sockets for SIMM memory cards are available. Only 1 MB or 4 MB SIMMs of the 9-chip type are supported, and if two are installed they have to be of like capacity. With two 4 MB SIMMs installed, the 1000 RSX can be expanded to 9 MB RAM without using an ISA slot. The RSX/HD variant comes with a 52 MB hard drive using an AT-compatible IDE interface; replacement hard drives up to 504 MB can be substituted. Because of the slimline case, only one hard drive can be installed alongside the 1.44 MB 3.5" floppy drive.

The motherboard has a socket for the 80387SX math coprocessor. The RSX still retains the Tandy 1000 3-voice sound hardware and DAC, though the I/O address for the 3-voice sound chip was moved, rendering many games compatible with it unable to play music unless modified. The DAC can be used to emulate the Covox Speech Thing via MS-DOS device drivers for limited sound support. This works with Chuck Yeager's Air Combat.

Windows 3.xx sound device drivers are available that work in Windows 95 (with full 9MB RAM) on Tandy 1000 RSX. The ACUMOS VGA graphics can be software-updated with Cirrus Logic BIOS (via MS-DOS driver) to allow VESA/SVGA to function in Windows 95, as the Windows 3.xx Tandy VGA drivers are insufficient for Windows 95.

== Select Tandy 1000-enhanced software ==
Major software publishers and makers of game and educational software, such as Sierra and Broderbund, offered software titles that support Tandy's 16-color graphics, 3-voice sound, and other Tandy-specific hardware features. These enhancements offer a superior graphics and sound experience for Tandy 1000 owners over CGA graphics or PC speaker sound widely used on most DOS PCs. Software that supported Tandy's graphics are typically labelled on the package as being Tandy 1000/PCjr compatible.

Although the Tandy 1000 can run most DOS software, the below programs are known to specifically support Tandy 1000 enhanced features. These programs require DOS to run. Tandy shipped its own version of DOS. The 1000 uses the main memory for graphics, so most programs require 640k or 768k to run. The enhanced graphics and sound often tax the processor, so an 80286 processor or faster is often recommended for best results.

- A-10 Tank Killer
- Alley Cat
- Arkanoid
- Caveman Ugh-Lympics
- Choplifter
- Defender of the Crown
- Digger
- Freddy Pharkas: Frontier Pharmacist
- Gauntlet
- King's Quest 1, 2, 3, 4, and 5
- Knights of the Sky
- Lemmings
- LHX Attack Chopper
- Loom
- Mario Teaches Typing
- Operation Wolf
- Out Run
- Police Quest
- Rastan
- Reader Rabbit
- RoboCop
- Sargon
- Sentinel Worlds I: Future Magic
- Shogun
- Silpheed
- Skate or Die
- Space Quest 1, 2, 3 and 4
- Teenage Mutant Ninja Turtles
- The Bard's Tale
- The Black Cauldron
- The Cycles: International Grand Prix Racing
- The Three Stooges
- Thexder 1 and 2
- Where in the World is Carmen Sandiego?
- Zak McKracken and the Alien Mindbenders
- Zeliard
- Darwin's Arena (a shareware game)

There are also games and educational software that supports second-generation Tandy 1000 graphics and sound, which offers 640 by 200 by 16 colors, and 8-bit DACs, found only on the 1000 SL/TL series. Examples of such software include Mario Teaches Typing, Star Trek, Freddy Pharkas: Frontier Pharmacist, and Sargon.
