= Computer case =

Enclosure that contains most of the computer hardware

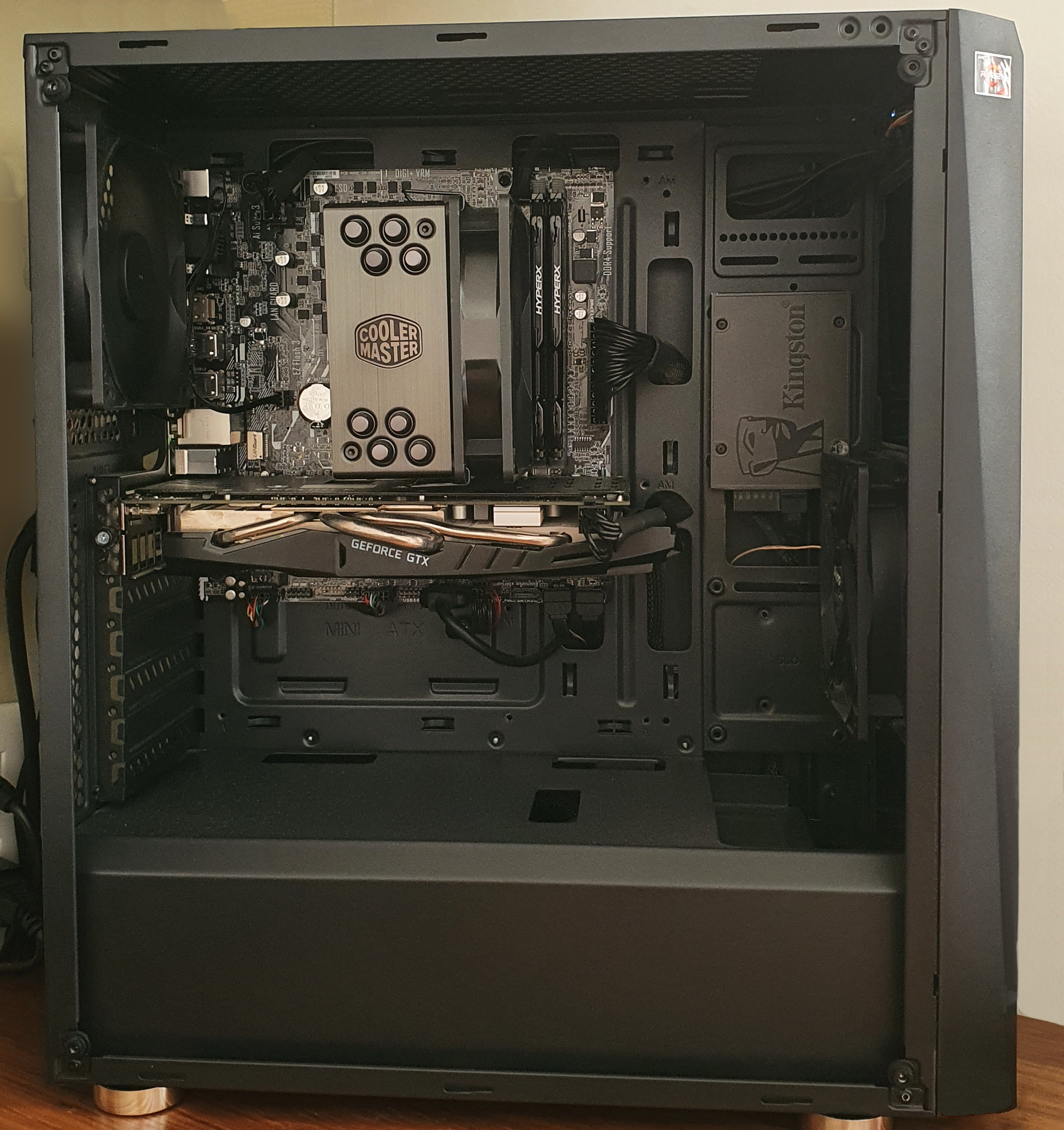
An opened ATX case, front towards right. Components pictured include a microATX motherboard (top), a CPU (beneath the Cooler Master fan), a GPU (middle), and an SSD (right). The power supply is housed in the compartment at bottom.

A computer case, also known as a computer chassis, is the enclosure that contains most of the hardware of a personal computer. The components housed inside the case (such as the CPU, motherboard, memory, mass storage devices, power supply unit and various expansion cards) are referred as the internal hardware, while hardware outside the case (typically cable-linked or plug-and-play devices such as the display, speakers, keyboard, mouse and USB flash drives) are known as peripherals.

Conventional computer cases are fully enclosed, with small holes (mostly in the back panel) that allow ventilation and cutout openings that provide access to plugs/sockets (back) and removable media drive bays (front). The structural frame (chassis) of a case is usually constructed from rigid metals such as steel (often SECC — steel, electrogalvanized, cold-rolled, coil) and aluminium alloy, with hardpoints and through holes for mounting internal hardware, case fans/coolers and for organizing cable management. The external case panels, at least one of which are removable, cover the chassis from the front, sides and top to shield the internal components from physical intrusion and dust collection, and are typically made from painted metallic and/or plastic material, while other materials such as mesh, tempered glass, acrylic, wood and even Lego bricks have appeared in many modern commercial or home-built cases. In recent years, open frame or open air cases that are only partly enclosed (with freer ventilation and thus theoretically better cooling) have become available in the premium gaming PC market.

== Sizes and terminology ==
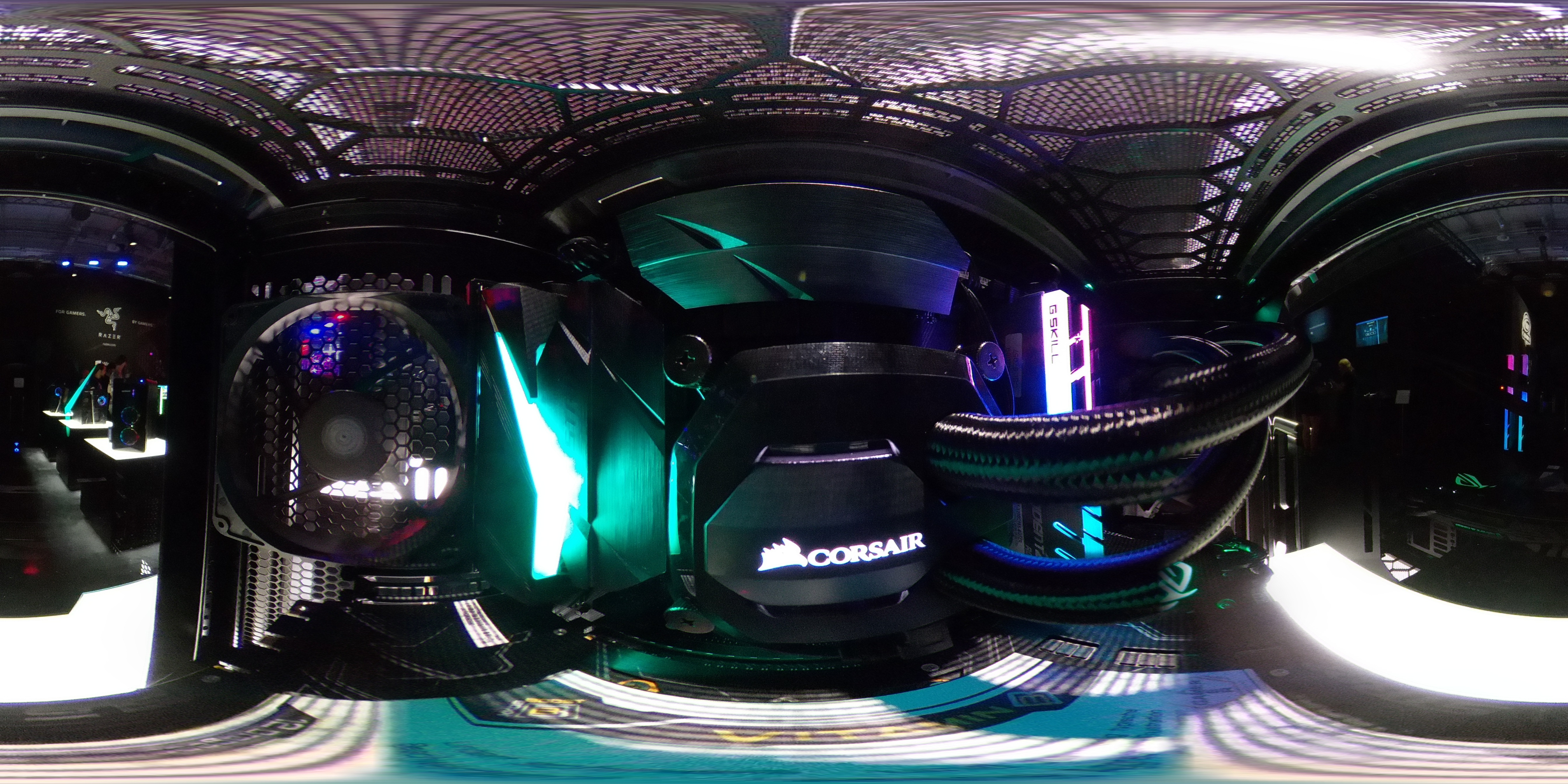
Inside a gaming case during gameplay. 360° photograph. (view as a 360° interactive panorama)

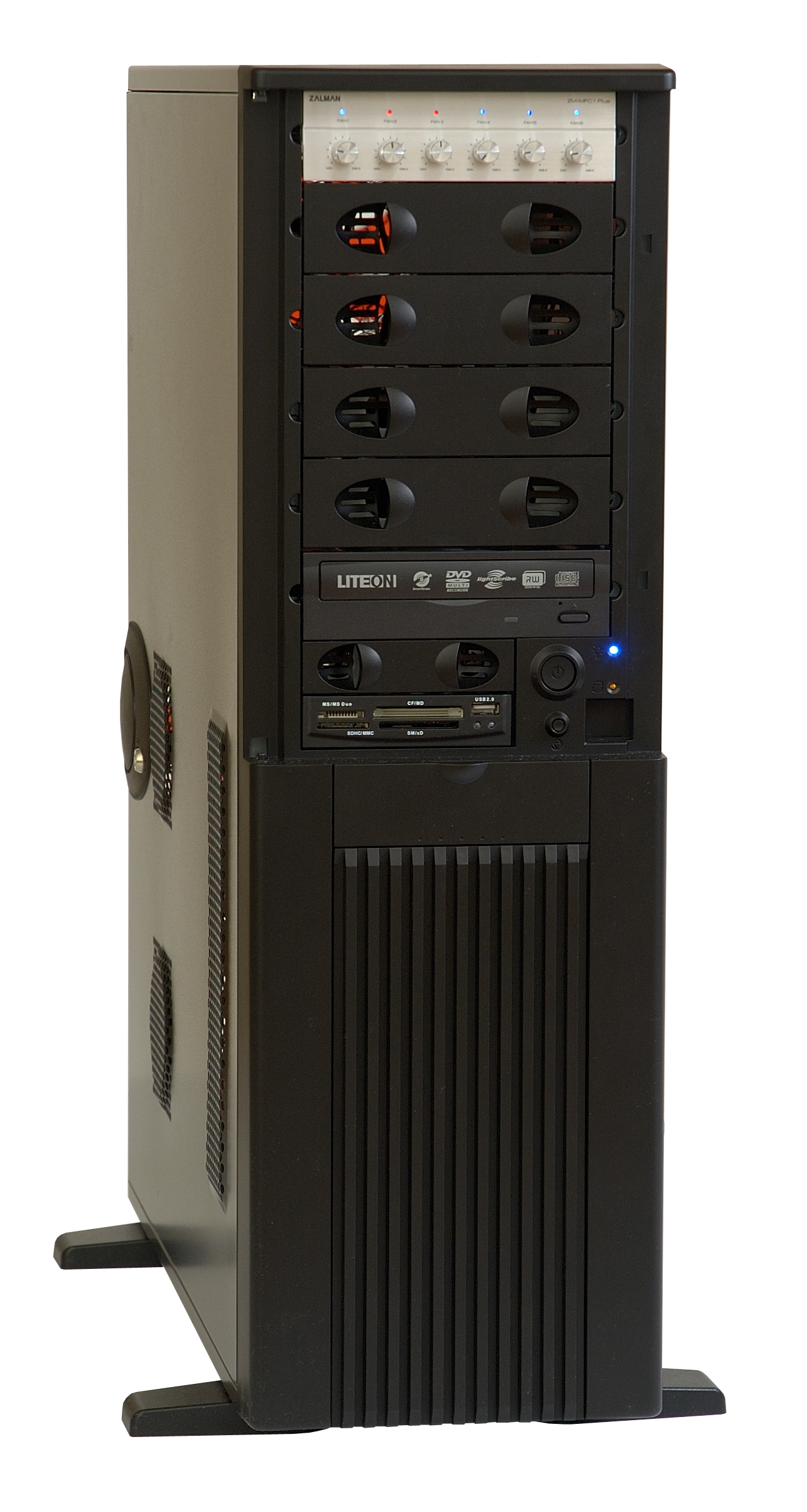
A full tower case. Accessories shown include: a fan controller, a DVD burner, and a USB memory card reader.

Cases can come in many different sizes and shapes, which are usually determined by the form factor of the motherboard since it is physically the largest hardware component in most computers. Consequently, personal computer form factors typically specify only the internal dimensions and layout of the case. Form factors for rack-mounted and blade servers may include precise external dimensions as well since these cases must themselves fit in specific enclosures.

For example, a case designed for an ATX motherboard and power supply unit (PSU) may take on several external forms such as a vertical tower (designed to sit on the floor, height > width), a flat desktop (height < width) or pizza box (height ≤ 5 cm or 2 in) designed to sit on the desk under the computer's monitor). Full-size tower cases are typically larger in volume than desktop cases, with more room for drive bays, expansion slots, and custom or all-in-one (AIO) water cooling solutions. Desktop cases—and mini-tower cases under about 46 cm (18 in) high—are popular in business environments where space is at a premium.

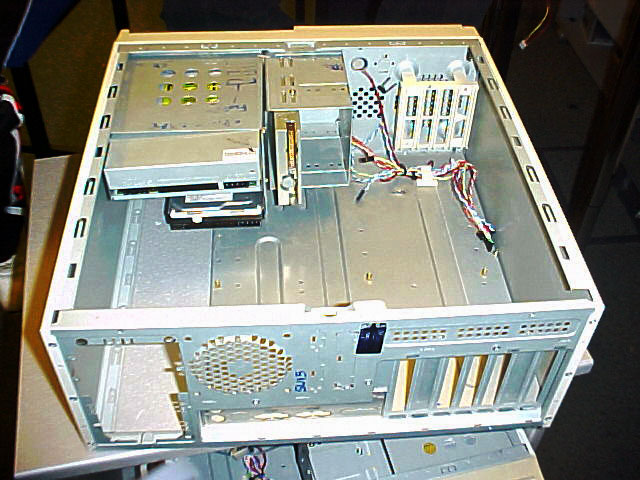
An empty computer case

Currently, the most popular form factor for desktop computers is ATX, although microATX and small form factors have also become very popular for a variety of uses. In the high-end segment, the unofficial and loosely defined XL-ATX specification appeared around 2009. It extends the length of the mainboard to accommodate four graphics cards with dual-slot coolers. Some XL-ATX mainboards increase the mainboard's width as well, to allow more space for the CPU, Memory PWM, and in some cases, a second CPU socket. While the market share of these exotic high-end mainboards is very low, almost all high-end cases and many mainstream cases support XL-ATX (10 expansion slots). As of 2018, no major motherboard manufacturer has made an XL-ATX board for several years. E-ATX is similar to XL-ATX in that it is larger than ATX and is also loosely defined. Unlike XL-ATX, E-ATX motherboards and cases are still in production (as of 2020), and support quad-channel memory across 8 slots of ram, up to 4 PCI-e expansion slots for up to 4 double slot graphics cards and a single CPU such as the AMD Ryzen Threadripper 3990X. Companies like In Win Development, Shuttle Inc. and AOpen originally popularized small cases, for which FlexATX was the most common motherboard size. As of 2010 Mini ITX has widely replaced FlexATX as the most common small form factor mainboard standard. The latest mini ITX mainboards from Asus, Gigabyte, MSI, ASRock, Zotac and Foxconn offer the same feature set as full size mainboards. High-end mini ITX mainboards support standard desktop CPUs, use standard memory DIMM sockets, and mostly feature a full-size PCI-E 16× slot with support for the fastest graphics cards, although some instead use a PCI, or PCIe slot of fewer than 16 lanes. This allows customers to build a fully-fledged high-end computer in a significantly smaller case. Apple Inc. has also produced the Mac Mini computer, which is similar in size to a standard CD-ROM drive, and many manufacturers offer mini-ITX cases of similar size for low-wattage CPUs with integrated graphics.

Tower cases are often categorized as mini-tower, midi-tower, mid-tower, or full-tower. The terms are subjective and inconsistently defined by different manufacturers.

Full tower cases are typically 56 cm (22 in) or more in height and intended to stand on the floor. They can have anywhere from six to ten externally accessible drive bays. These cases were originally developed to house file servers which would typically be tasked with serving data from expensive CD-ROM databases that held more data than the hard drives commonly available at the time. Hence, many full tower cases include locking doors and other physical security features to prevent theft of the discs. However, as computing technology moves from floppy disks and CD-ROMs to large capacity hard drives, USB flash drives, and network-based solutions, more recent full tower cases typically only have none, one, or two external bays for CD drives, with the internal bays moved elsewhere in the case to improve airflow. Today, full tower cases are commonly used by enthusiasts as showpiece display cases with custom water cooling, lighting, and tempered glass (replacing acrylic). They may also hold two computers (as is the case with the Corsair 1000D) and dual power supplies (Corsair 900D).

Mid-tower cases are smaller, about 46 cm (18 in) high with two to four external bays. They may also hold two computers.

A mini-tower case will typically have only one or two external bays.

The marketing term midi-tower sometimes refers to cases smaller than mid-tower but larger than mini-tower, typically with two to three external bays. Other times the term may be synonymous with mid-tower.

== Layout ==
Computer cases usually include sheet metal enclosures for a power supply unit and drive bays, as well as a rear panel that can accommodate peripheral connectors protruding from the motherboard and expansion slots. Most cases also have a power button or switch, a reset button, and LEDs to indicate power, hard drive activity, and network activity in some models. Many cases include built-in I/O ports (such as USB and headphone ports) on the front panel of the case. Such a case will also (normally) include the wires needed to connect these ports, switches, and indicators to the motherboard.

=== Major component locations ===
- The motherboard is usually screwed to the case along its largest face, which could be the bottom or the side of the case depending on its form factor and orientation.
- Form factors such as ATX provide a back panel with cut-out holes to expose I/O ports provided by integrated peripherals, as well as expansion slots which may optionally expose additional ports provided by expansion cards. Many larger ATX cases can also be used with motherboards of other form factors.
- The power supply unit mounting point differs from case to case, but the most commonly used locations (both at the rear of the case) and their advantages/disadvantages are:
  - The top of the case, usually allowing the PSU's built-in fan to act as an auxiliary exhaust fan but causes the PSU to be fed air heated by the internal components of the case, thus causing PSU efficiency and lifespan degradation.
  - The bottom of the case, with an (often filtered) vent in the bottom of the case allowing the PSU to draw cool air from the outside.
- Regardless of the mounting position, the PSU will usually be attached to the case with four screws to support its weight.
- Most cases include drive bays on the front of the case; a typical ATX case includes 5.25", 3.5" and 2.5" bays. In modern computers, the 5.25" bays are used for optical drives, the 3.5" bays are used for hard drives and card readers, and the 2.5" bays are used for solid-state drives.
- Buttons and LEDs are typically located on the front of the case; some cases include additional I/O ports, temperature, and processor speed monitors in the same area.
- Vents are often found on the front, back, top, left side panel, and sometimes on the right-side panel of the case. Regardless of their placement, their purpose is either to let cool air into the case or to let hot air out. Larger vents usually allow cooling fans to be mounted via surrounding threaded screw holes. Newer cases include mountings for larger 120 mm or 140 mm cooling fans for quieter operation than the 80 mm fans formerly common.
- An I/O template, or I/O plate, fits around the motherboard's back panel of external ports. Sometimes provided by the case manufacturer, it is often replaced by the one that comes with the motherboard.

=== Internal access ===
Accessing the interior components of a modern ATX tower case is done by removing the side panels. Looking front-to-back, accessing the motherboard, PSU, drive bays, and most case fan installation points are done by removing the left side panel. Removing the right-side panel is done less often to access the space behind the motherboard mounting plate. This space is devoted to cable management, as cables routed in front of the motherboard may disrupt the flow of air within the case causing increased temperatures. BTX, an uncontemporary standard, has the main side panel on the right side as opposed to the left. Some upside-down designed ATX cases are also accessed by removing the right-side panel door.

Alternatively, the case may have a single large U-shaped cover that saddles the chassis. This was ubiquitous in AT tower cases.

To prevent the buildup of performance-degrading dust within the case, many models feature dust filters in front of the air intake fans. While the exact method of accessing the front filters depends on the case model, it usually requires the removal of the entire front panel. Removal of the front panel itself may or may not require the removal of one or both of the side panels. Consulting its user's manual is encouraged if there is any doubt.

Traditionally, most computer cases required computer case screws to hold components and panels in place (i.e. motherboard, PSU, drives, and expansion cards). From the early 2000s onwards there is a trend towards tool-less cases, in which components are held together with snap-in plastic rails, thumbscrews, and other methods that do not require tools; this facilitates quick assembly and modification of computer hardware and is also cheaper to manufacture.

== Appearance ==
Throughout the 1990s, most computer cases had simple rectangular shapes, and were often painted beige or white with little attention given to the visual design. Beige box designs are still found on a large number of budget computers assembled from generic components. These class of machines are now known as white box computers, even though the cases for these types of machines are now generally colored black or silver instead of beige. More modern computer cases include a much wider range of variation in shape, color, form factor, and materials, such as brushed aluminium and/or tempered glass which are offered with more expensive cases.

Case modding is the artistic styling of computer cases, often to draw attention to the use of advanced or unusual components. Since the early 2000s, some cases have included clear side panels or acrylic windows so that users can look inside while it is operating. Modded cases may also include colored internal lighting, custom paint, or liquid cooling systems. Some hobbyists build custom cases from raw materials like aluminum, steel, styrofoam, acrylic, or wood.

Historically, cases used CCFL lighting and eventually single color LEDs as strips or in fans to illuminate their interior; modern cases use RGB LED lighting instead, often incorporated into case fans. To improve airflow while allowing RGB fans to be visible, many cases as of 2020 use metal meshes, without any external bays. Many include a PSU shroud and vertical gpu mounts. Some used to include holes to support external water cooling radiators. Cases with side windows may have side fans (on the window) as well, although it is uncommon for cases with glass windows to have side fans.

=== Case manufacturers ===
Prominent after-market case manufacturers include Antec, BitFenix, Cooler Master, Corsair, Fractal Design, In Win Development, Lian Li, NZXT Corp., Phanteks, Rosewill, and Thermaltake, (DIY PC)

== Intrusion detection ==
Some computer cases include a biased switch (push-button) which connects to the motherboard. When the case is opened, the switch position changes, and the system records this change. The system's firmware or BIOS may be configured to report this event the next time it is powered on. This physical intrusion detection system may help computer owners detect tampering with their computers. However, most such systems are quite simple in construction; a knowledgeable intruder can open the case or modify its contents without triggering the switch.

In the past, many tower cases (including full tower cases) intended to house file servers featured a locking door covering the external drive bays. This was a security feature intended to prevent the theft of the CD-ROM discs the drives would be holding. At the time, CD-ROM capacity was larger than the hard disks available, and many business-critical databases were distributed on this media. These databases were often very expensive or held proprietary data, and hence would be likely targets for casual theft.

== Gallery ==
Computer cases

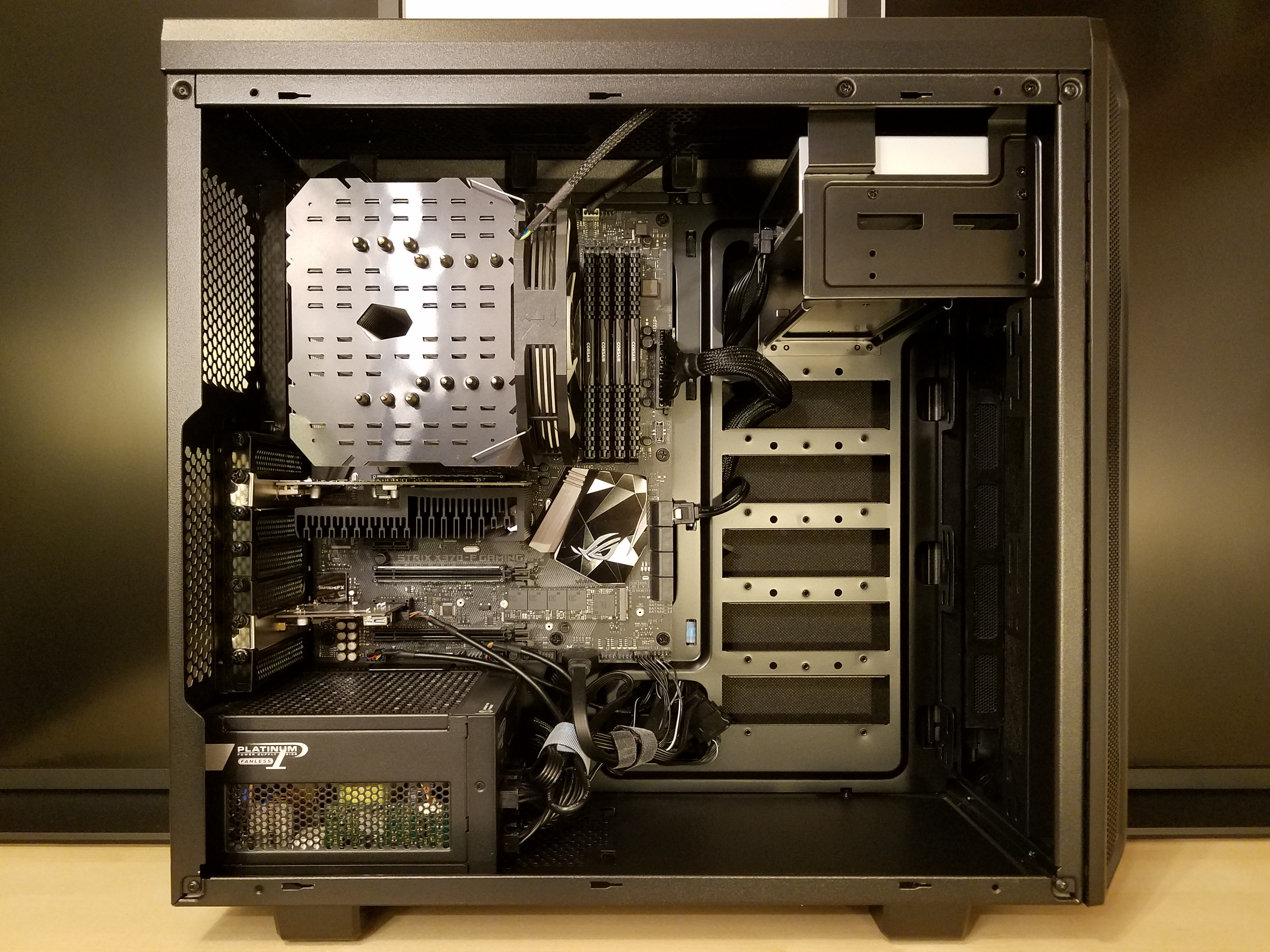
Interior of a 2018 ATX computer tower

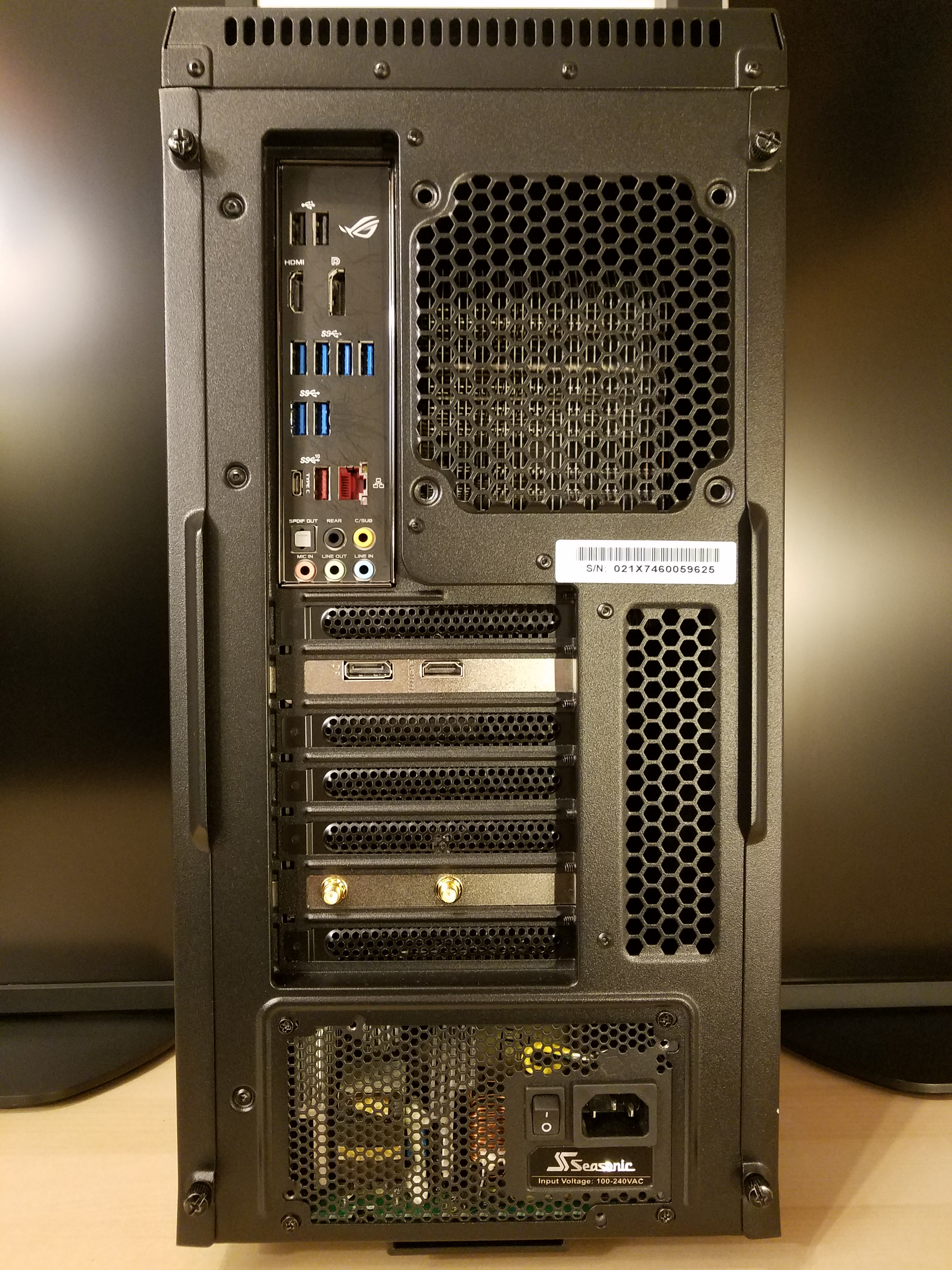
Back of an ATX computer tower

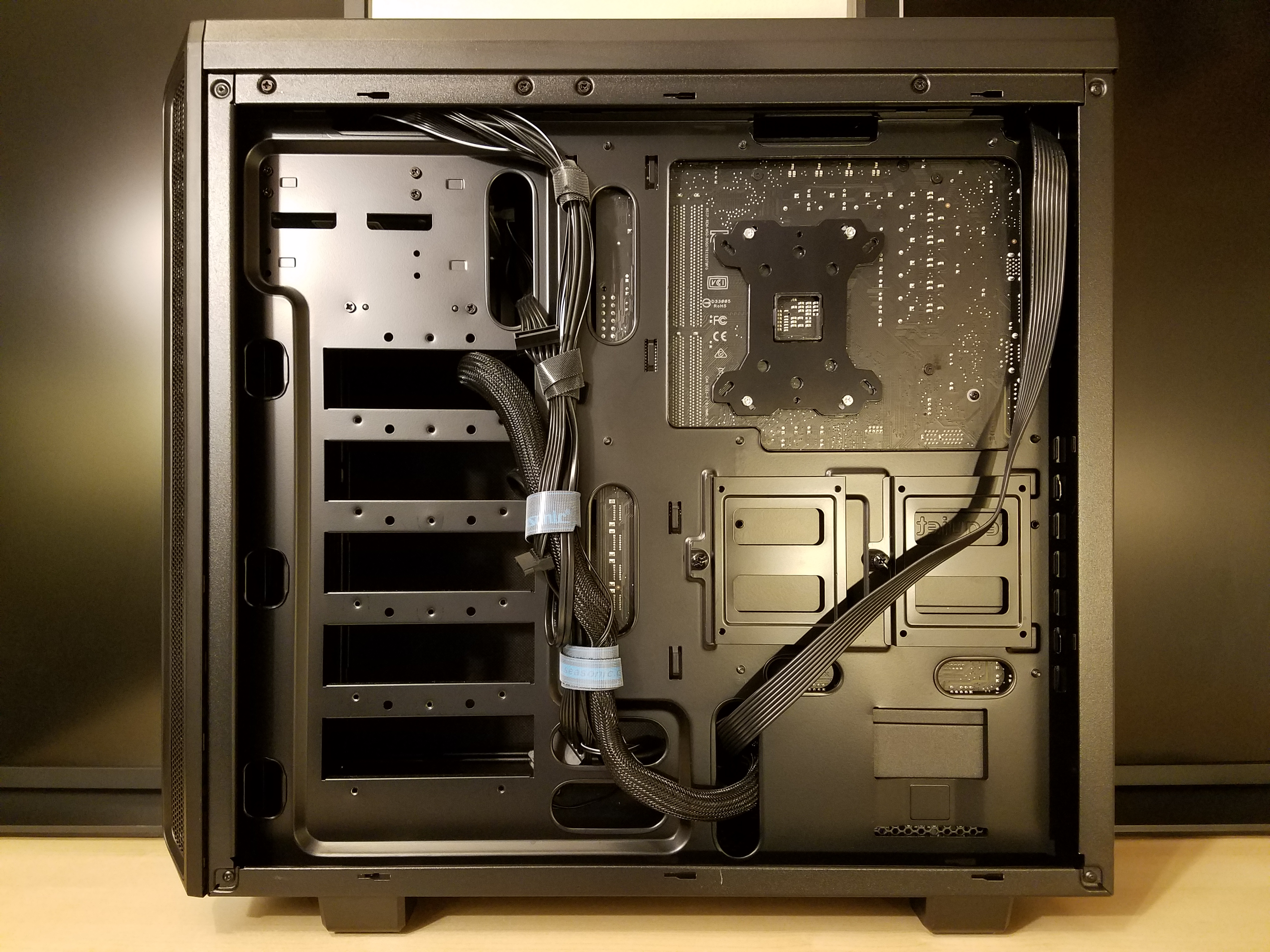
Right part of an ATX computer case with the fixing of the CPU at top right

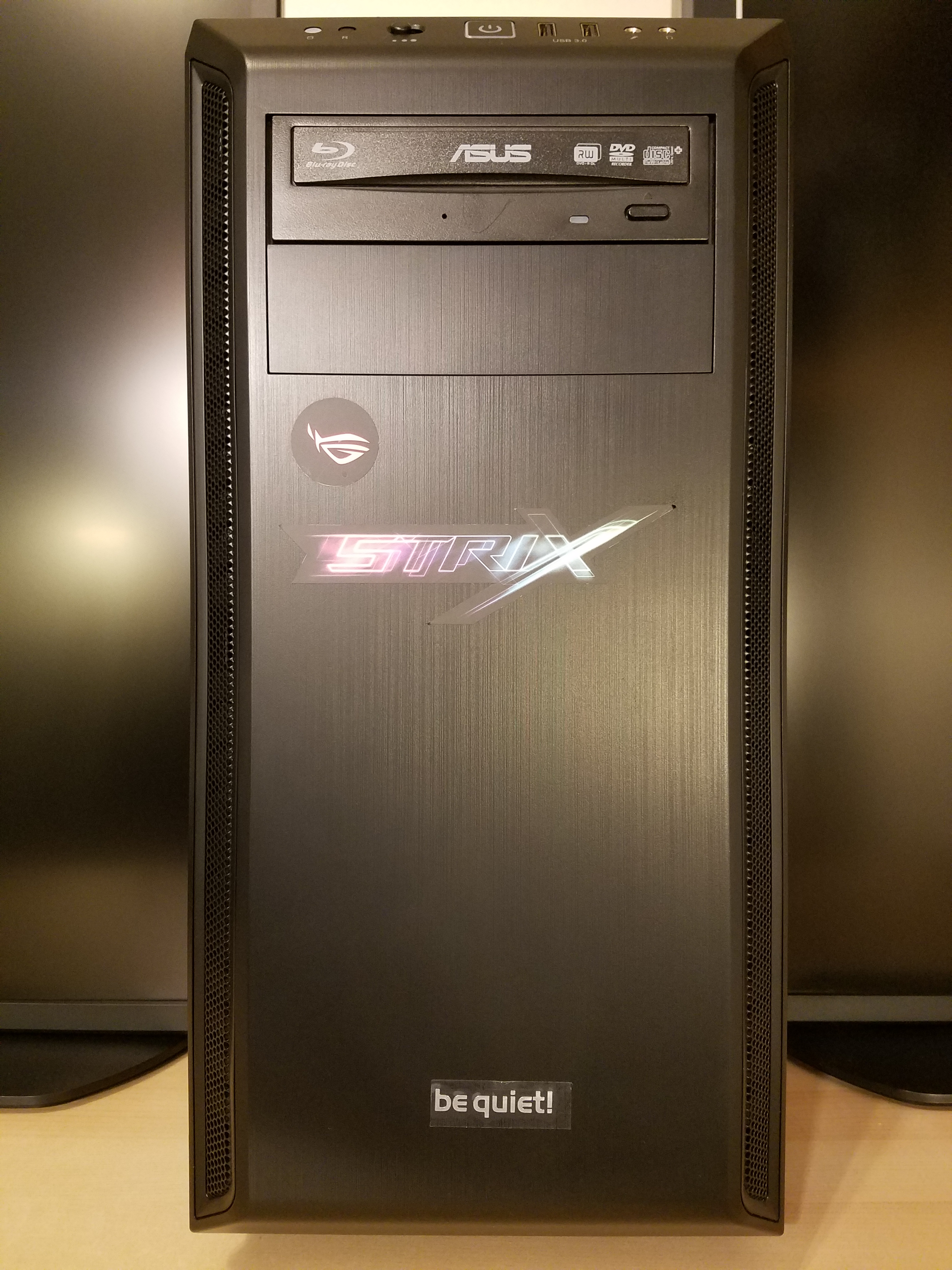
Front of an ATX computer case

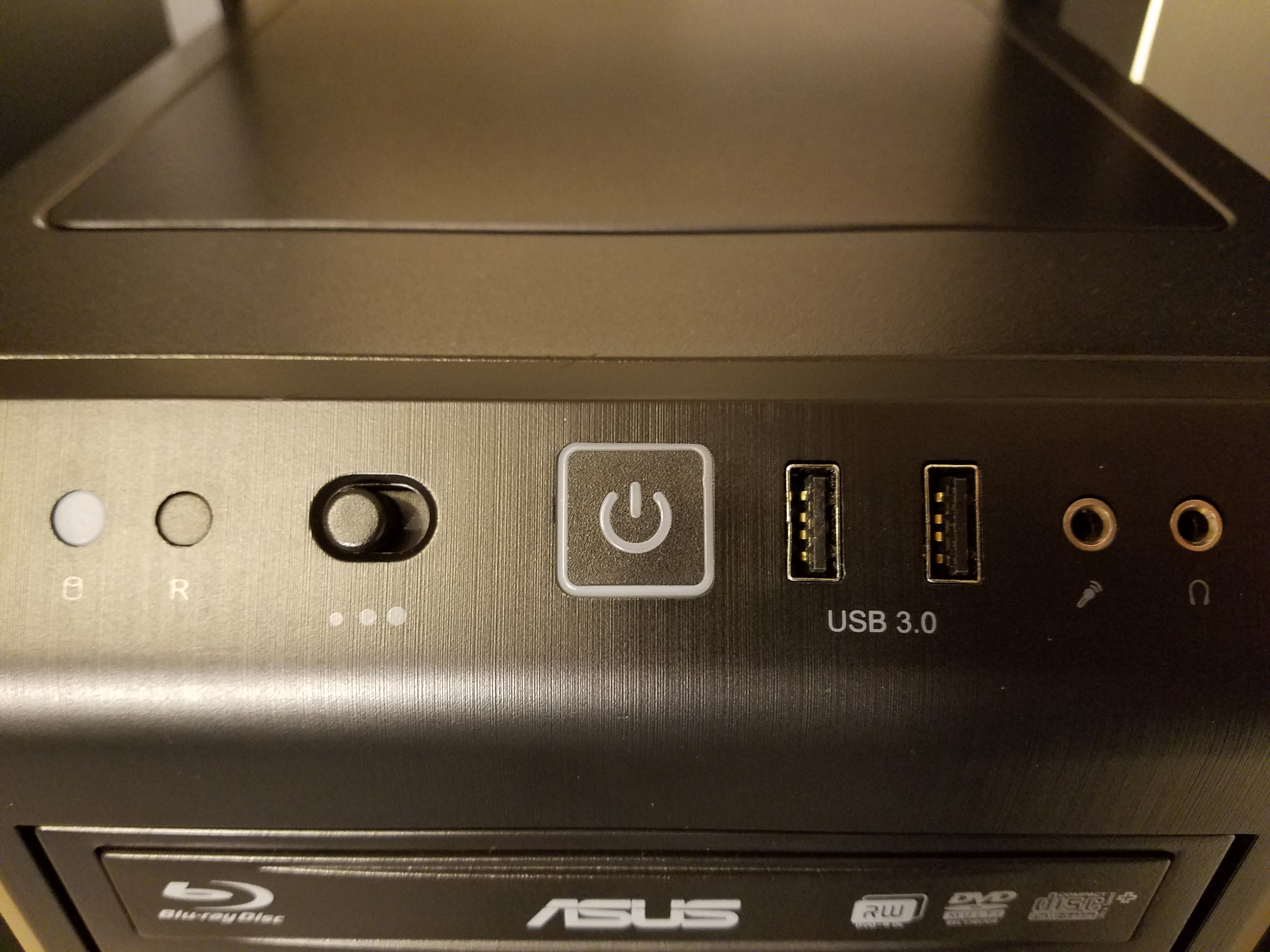
Facade buttons of an ATX computer case

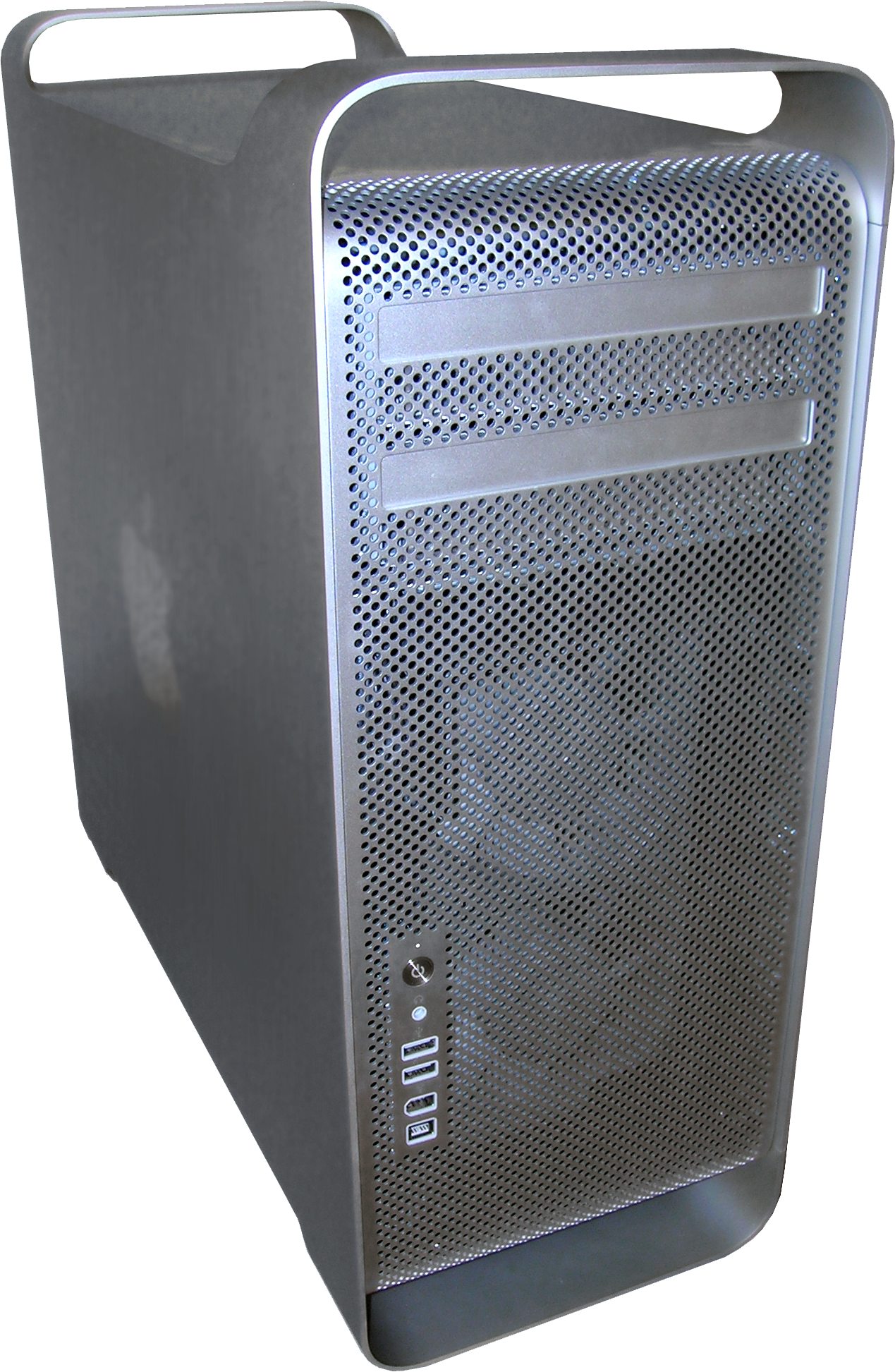
Mac Pro tower case. Note the two barely visible front intake fans.

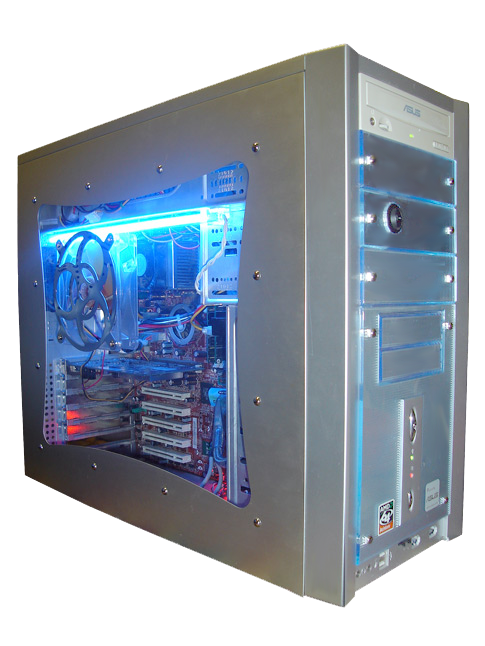
Enthusiast case featuring translucent panel casemod

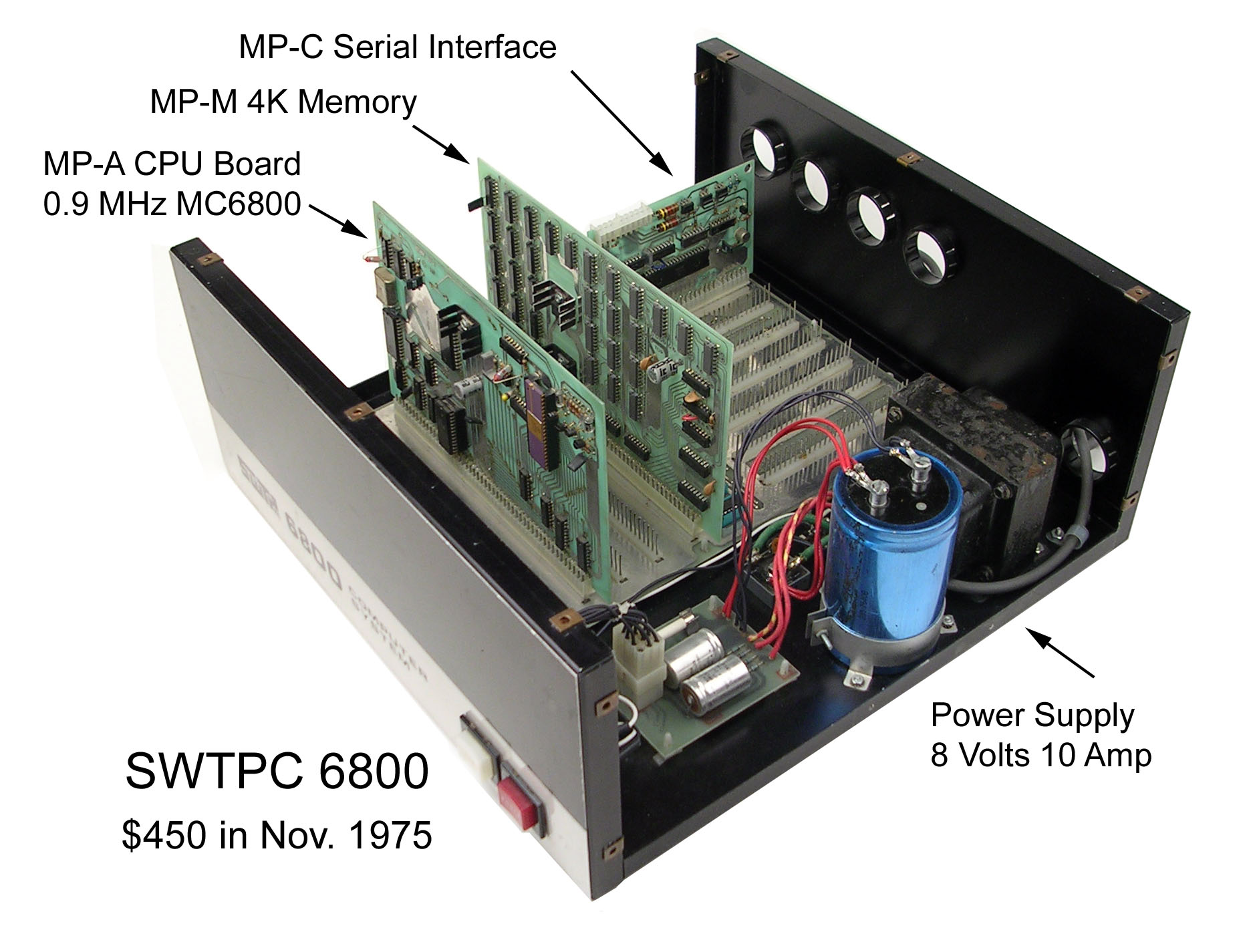
SWTPC 6800 case with SS-50 and SS-30 buses—an early hobbyist machine

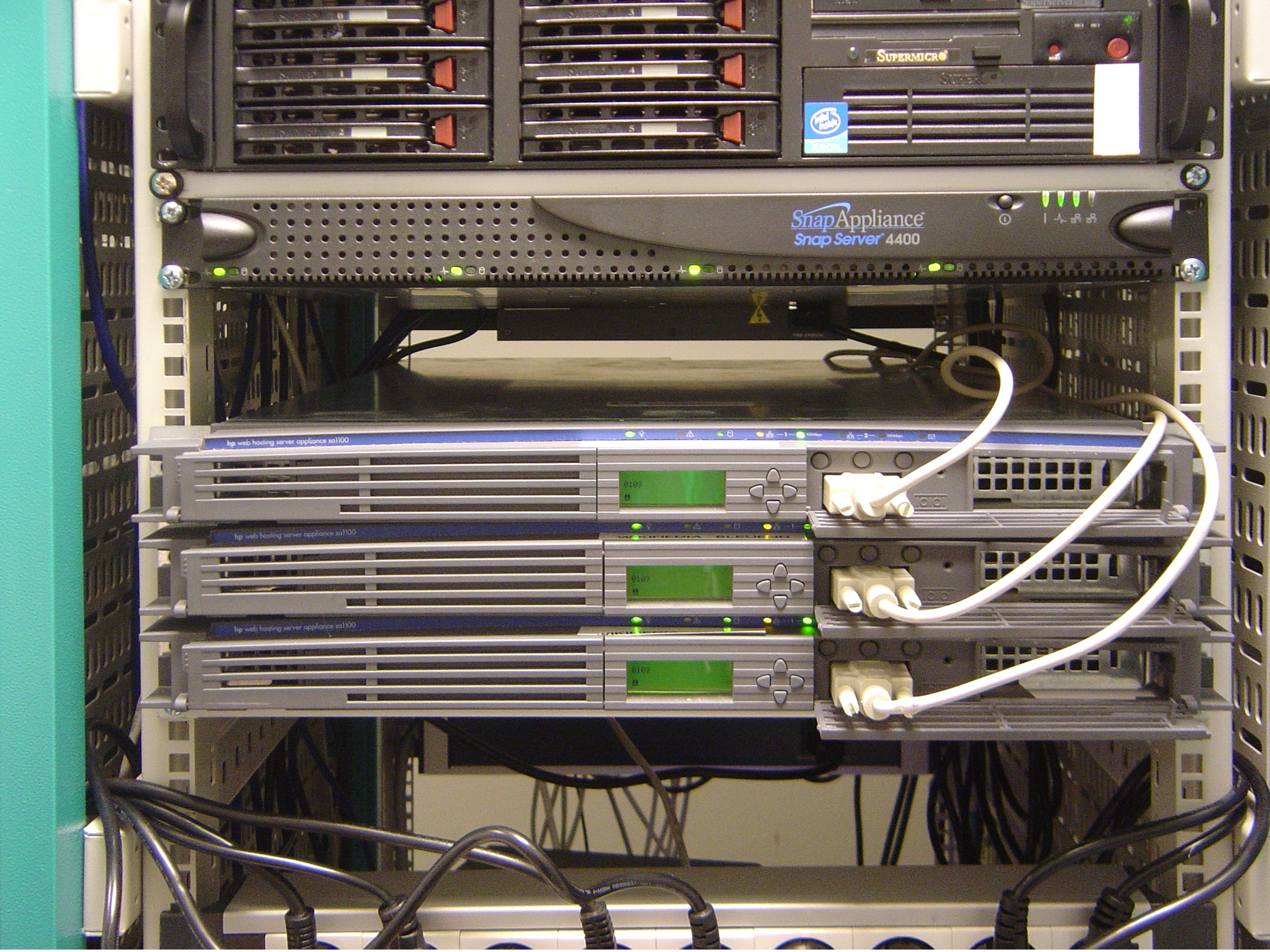
Three of the Wikimedia servers in 1U rackmount cases

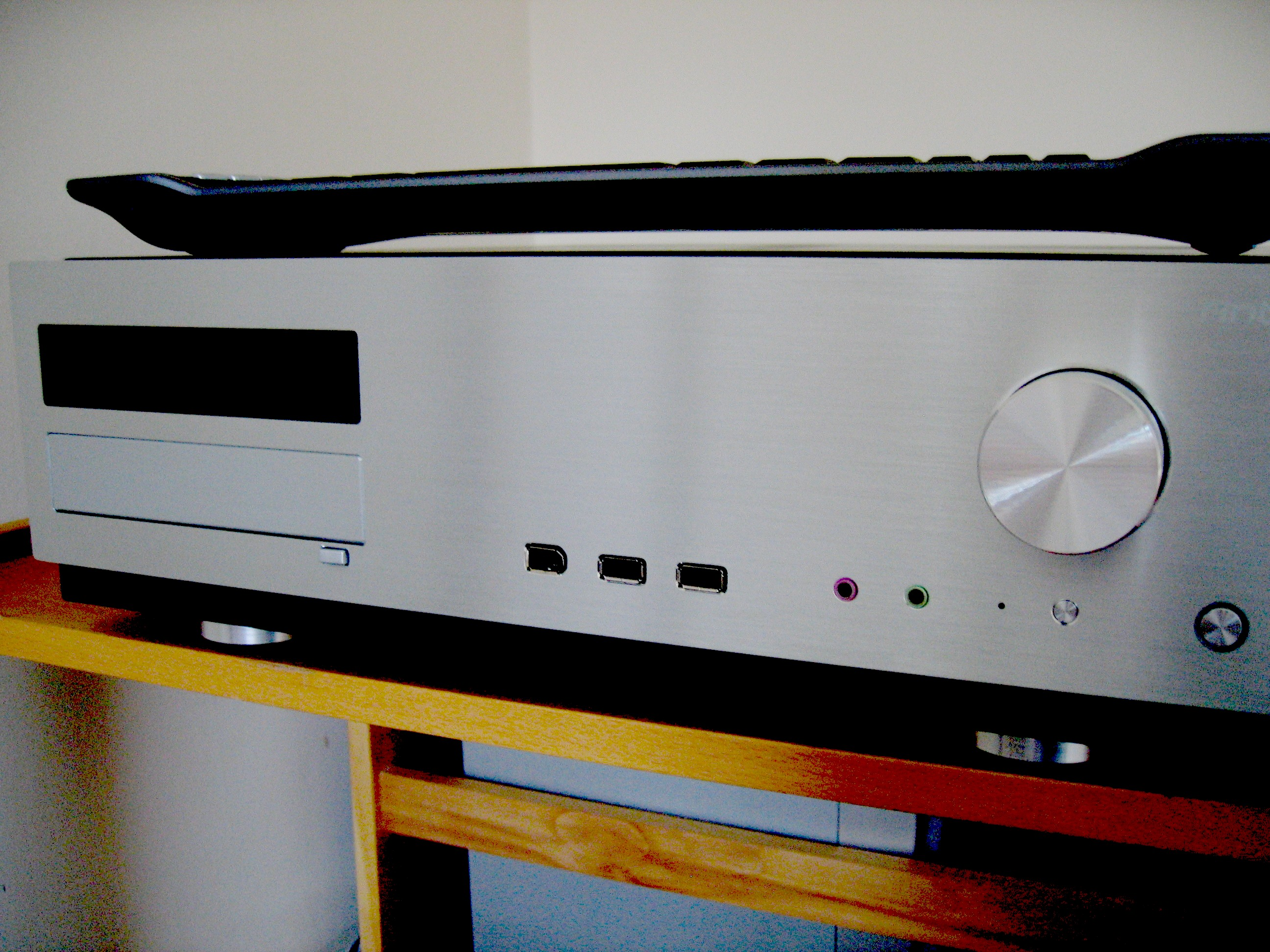
Antec Fusion V2 home theater PC case with VFD display, volume control and some ports on front

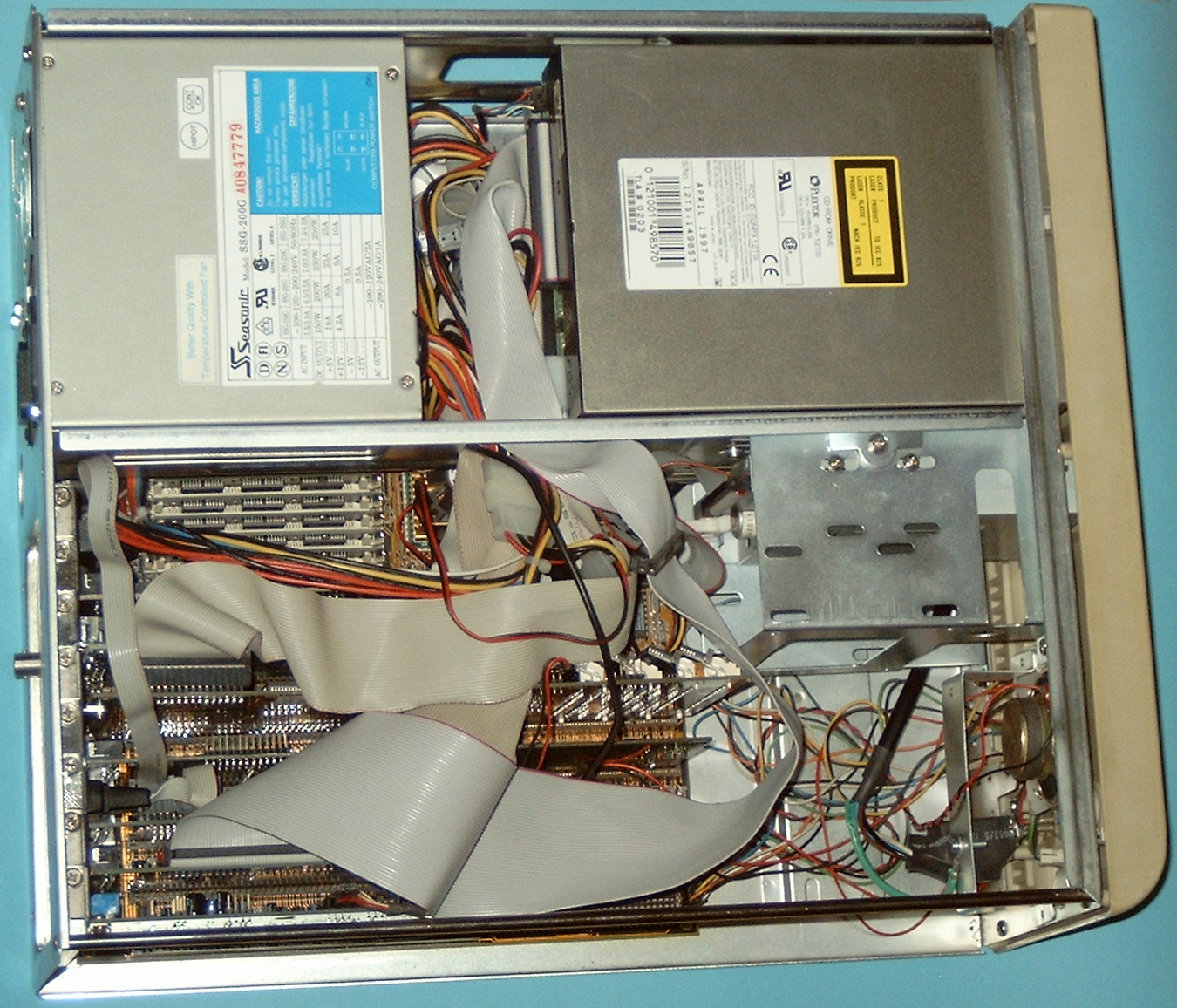
8-slot Baby AT form factor case

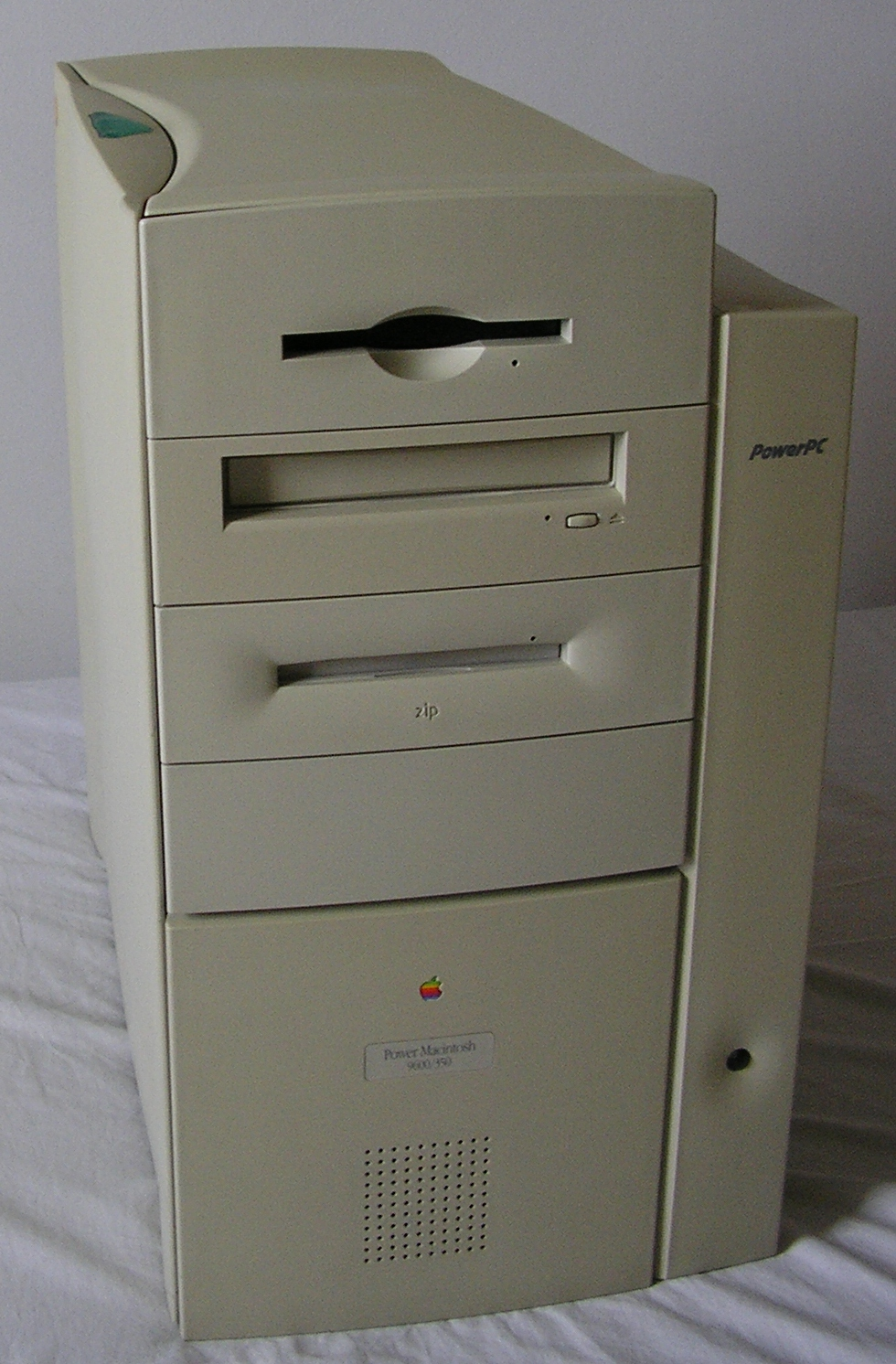
Power Mac tower case

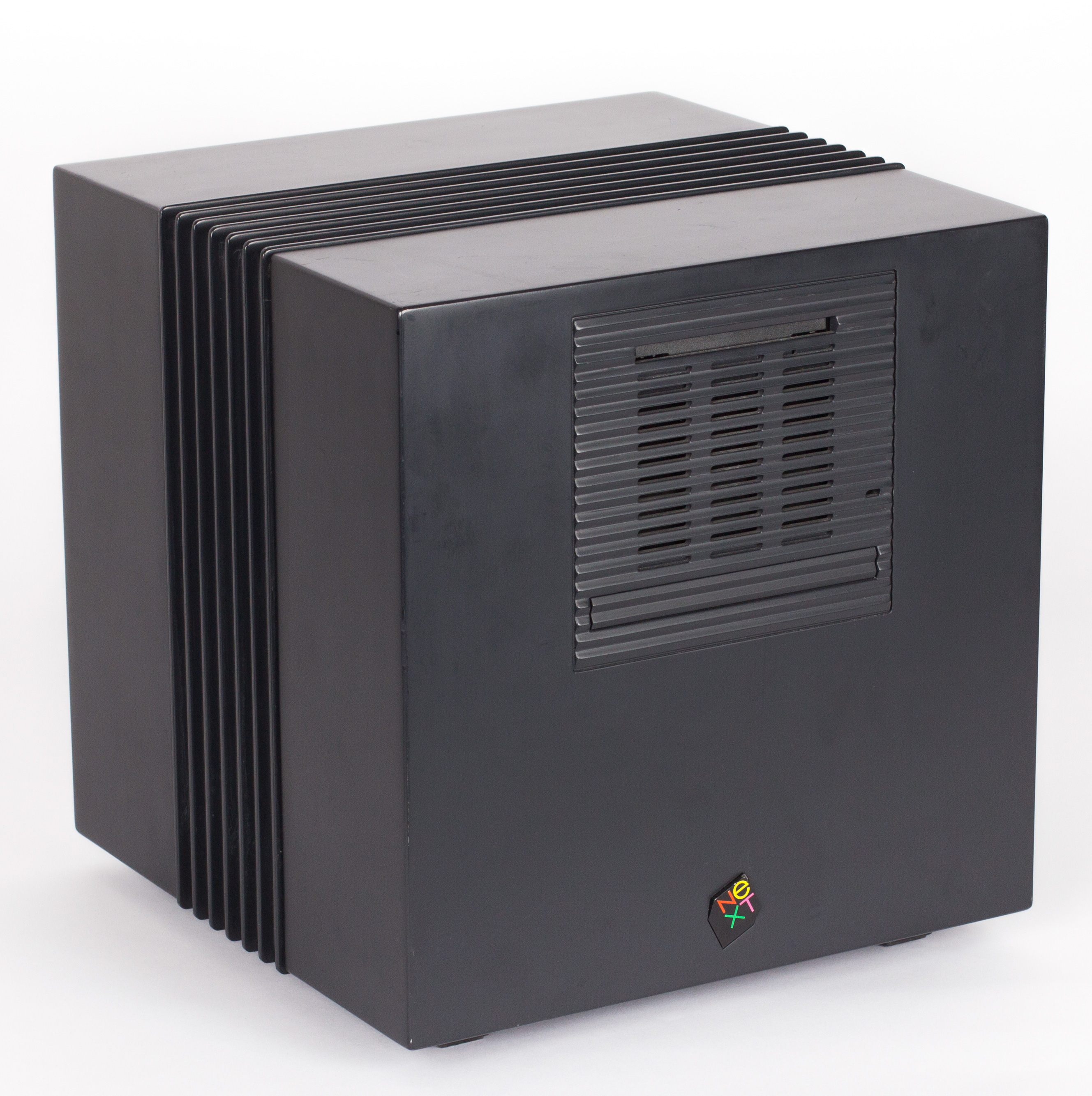
NeXT Cube

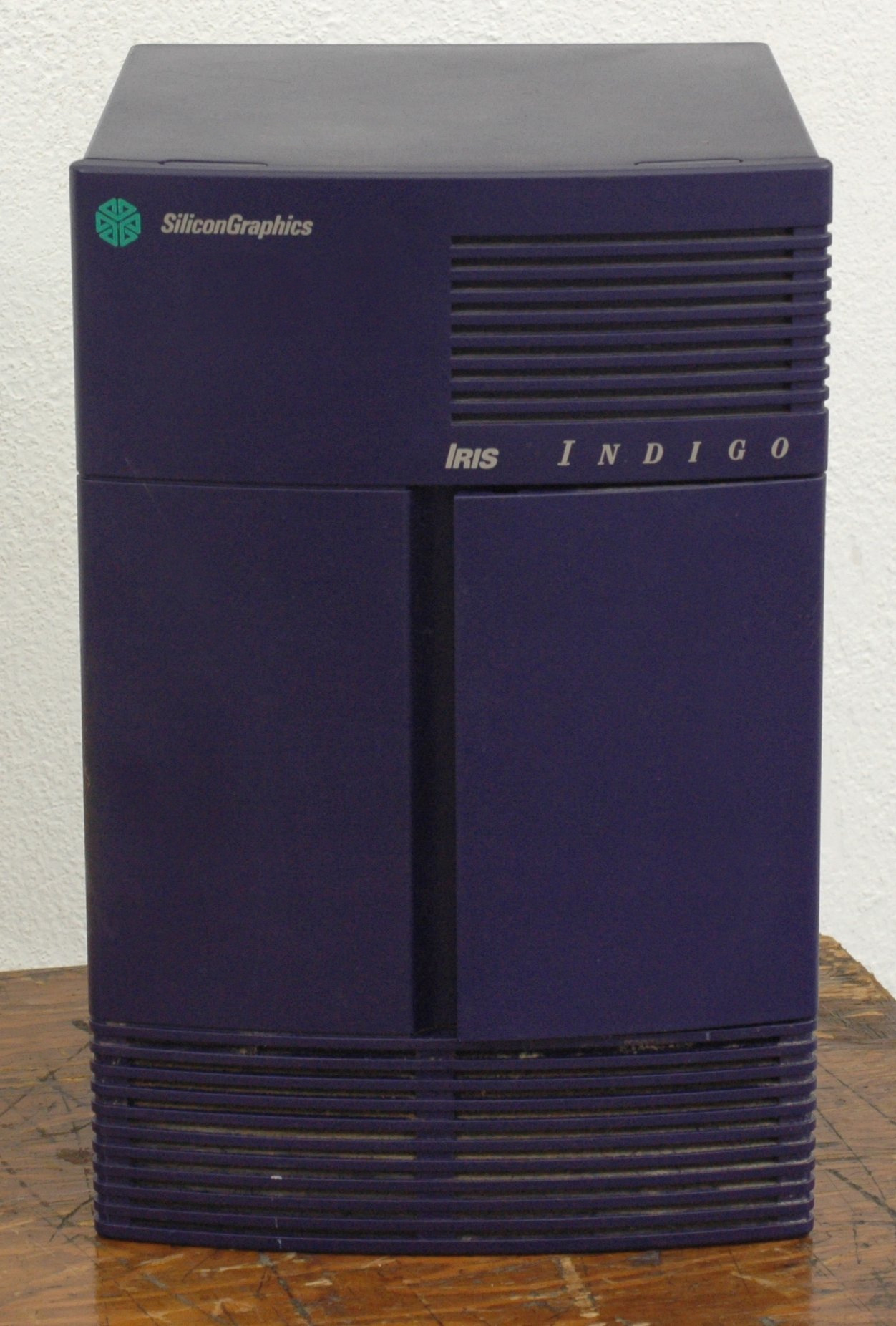
SGI Indigo tower case

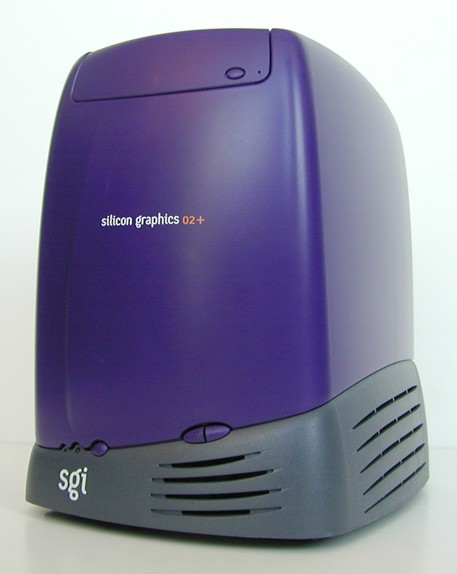
SGI O2 tower case

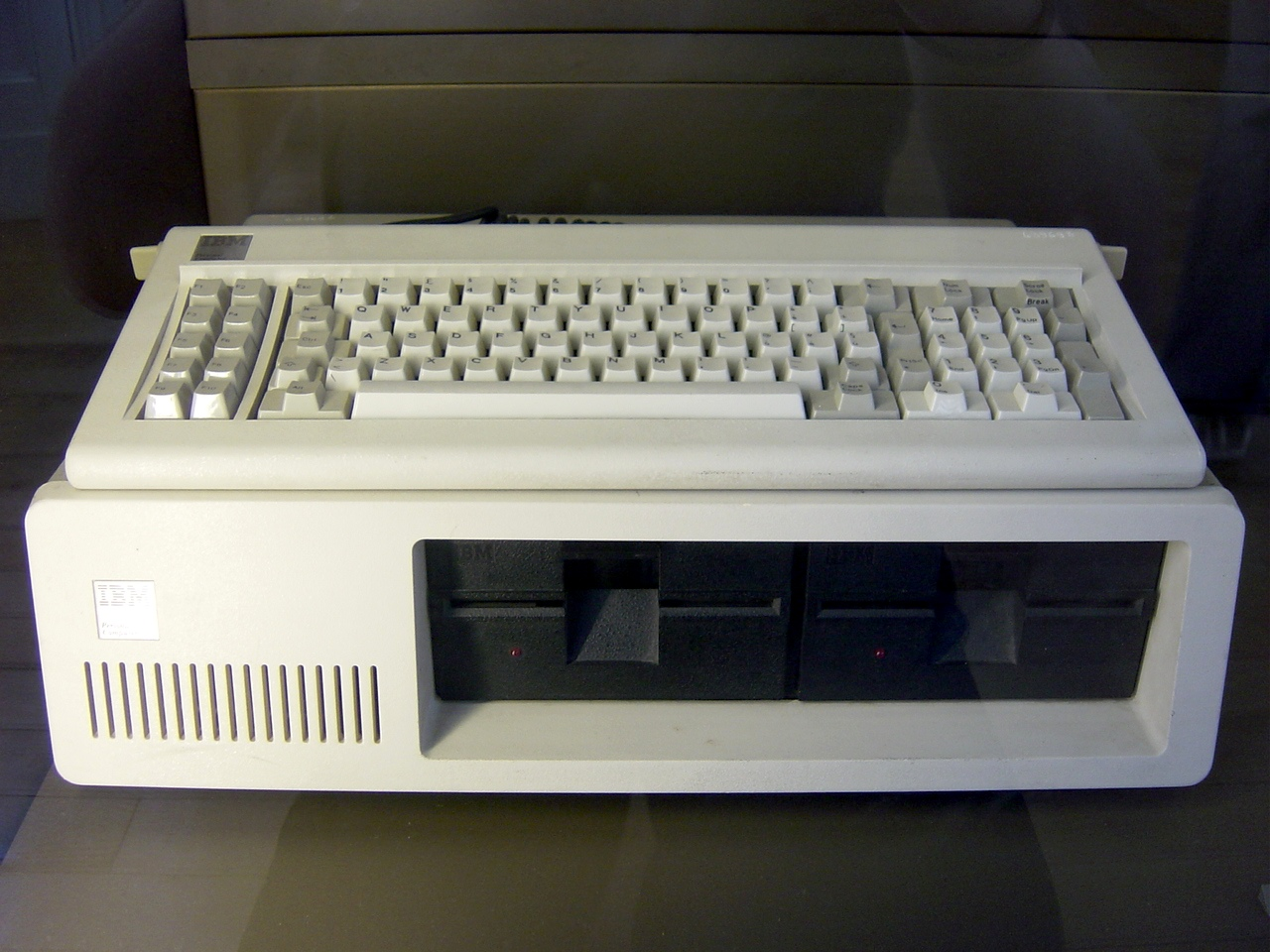
IBM Personal Computer

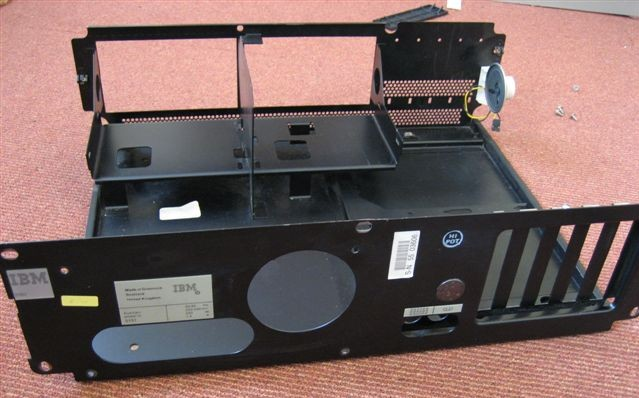
IBM Personal Computer 5150 bare 5-slot case

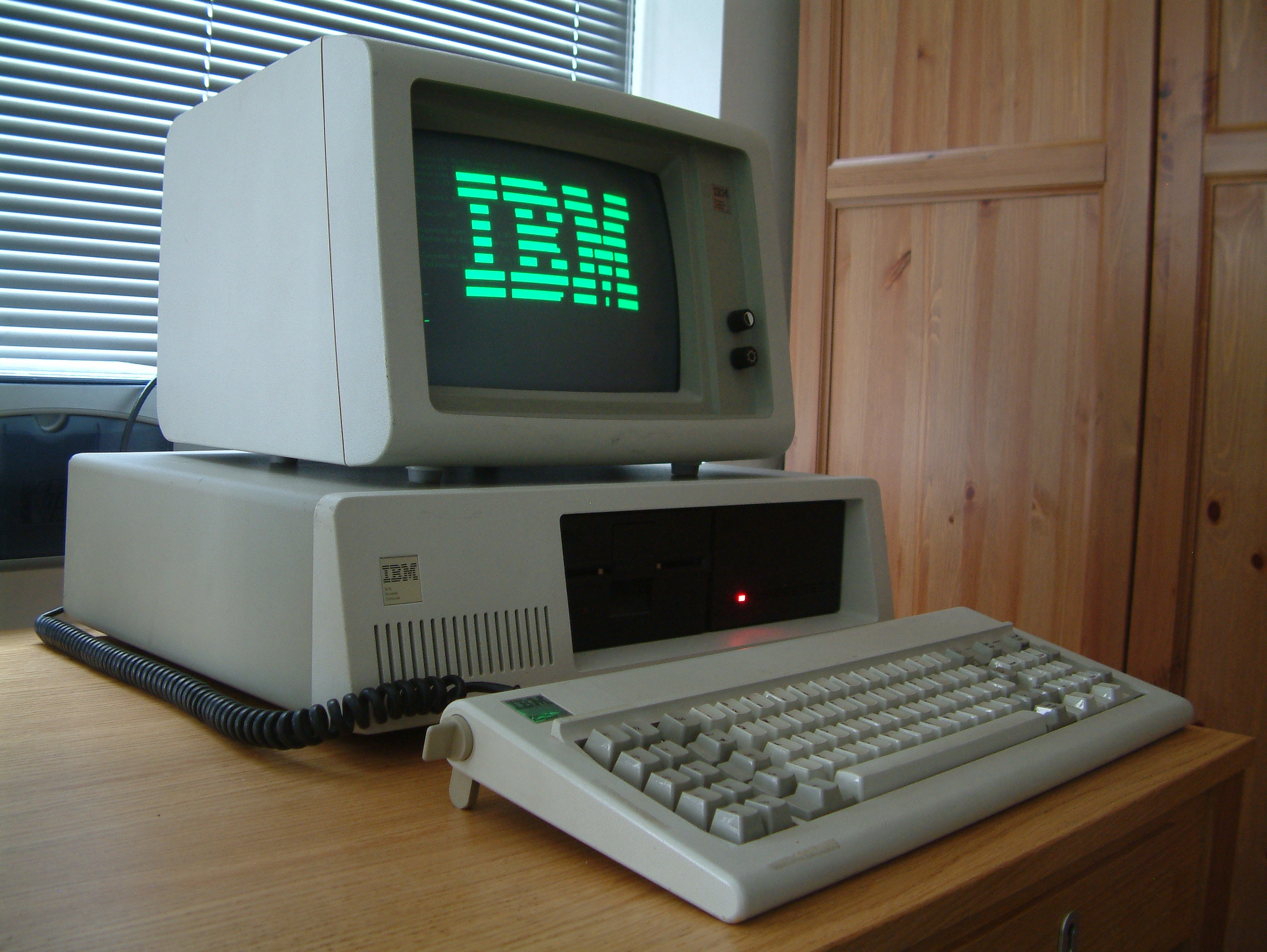
IBM Personal Computer XT

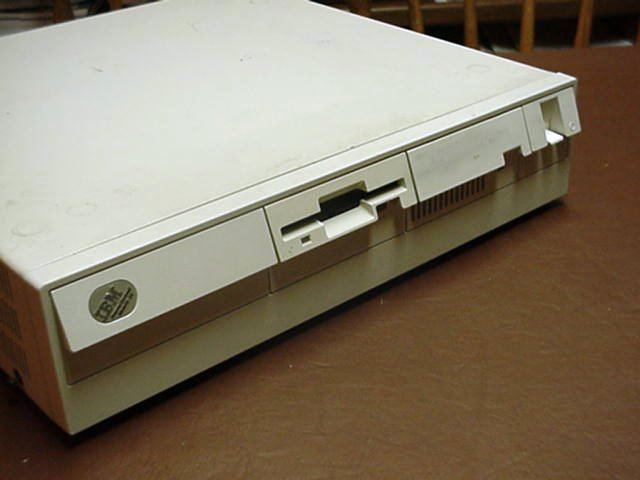
IBM PS/2 Model 55 SX

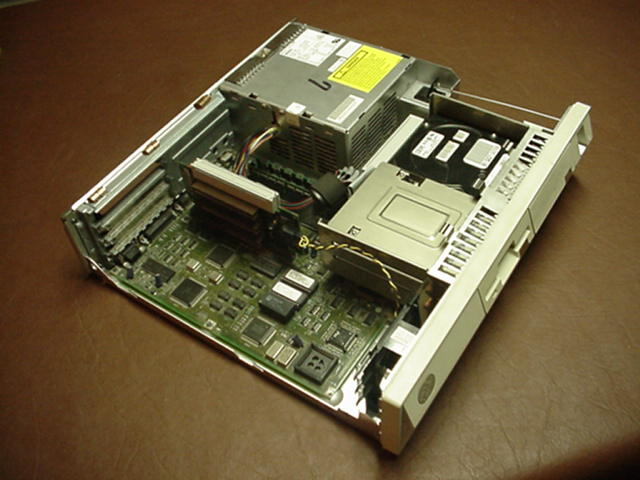
IBM PS/2 Model 55 SX

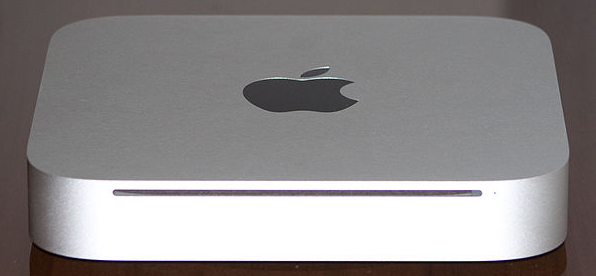
The 2010 Mac Mini from Apple

== See also ==
- List of computer hardware
- 3D printing
- List of computer hardware manufacturers
- Novena
- Thermally Advantaged Chassis
- VIA OpenBook open case design standard.
- Computer cooling
- Computer tower
- Computer fan
