= Micro-Star International =

Taiwanese information technology company

Coordinates: 25.006954°N 121.486846°E

Micro-Star International Co., Ltd.
- Primary logo

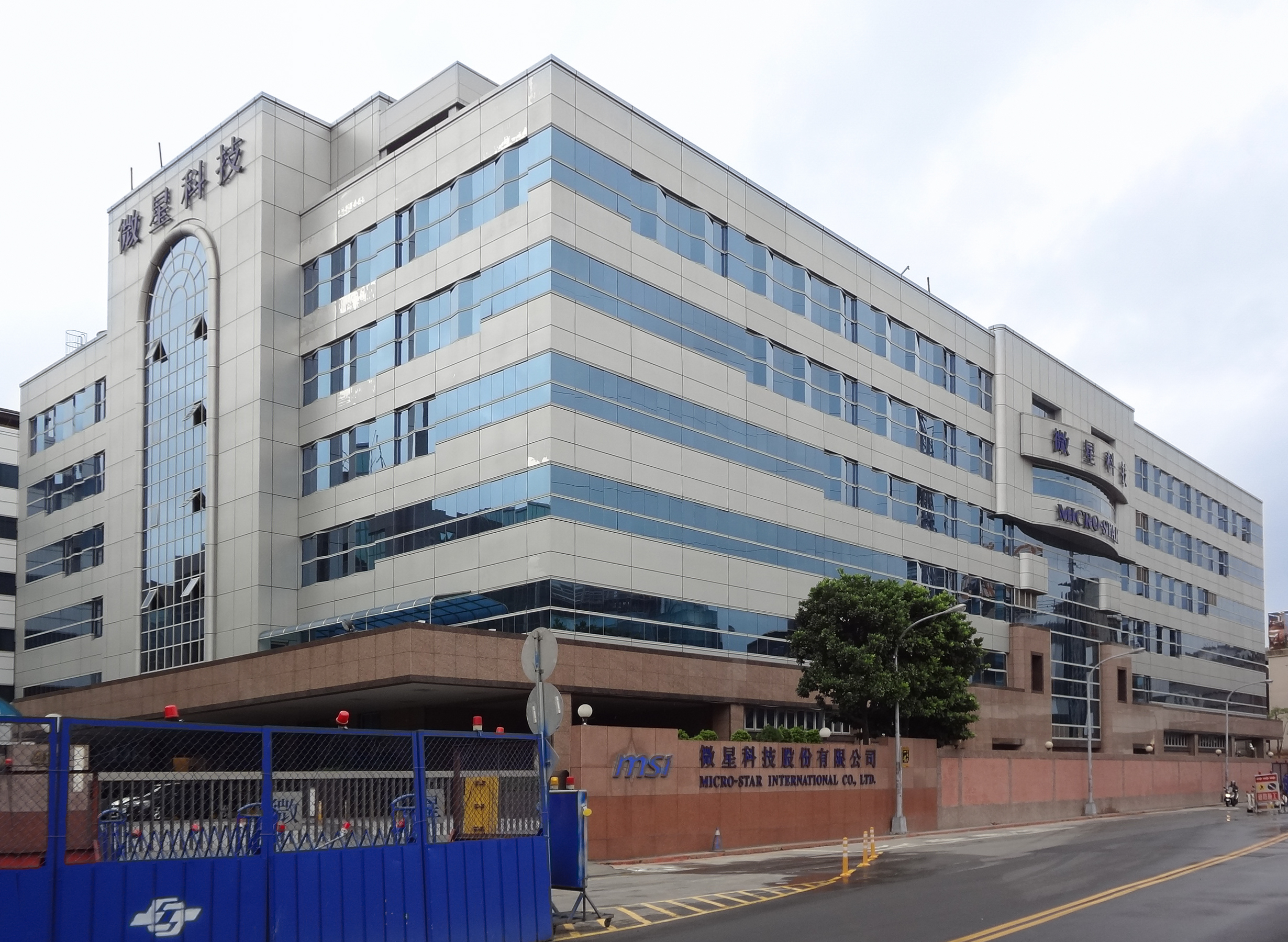
- Headquarters in New Taipei City, Taiwan, in 2013
- Native name: 微星科技股份有限公司
- Type: Public
- Traded as: TWSE: 2377
- ISIN: TW0002377009
- Industry: Computer hardware Electronics
- Founded: 4 August 1986; 40 years ago in Taiwan
- Founders: Joseph Hsu; Jeans Huang; Frank Lin; Kenny Yu; Henry Lu
- Headquarters: Zhonghe, New Taipei, Taiwan
- Area served: Worldwide
- Key people: Joseph Hsu (Chairman); Jeans Huang (President)
- Products: Laptop computers; Personal computers; All-in-one computers; Motherboards; Graphics cards; Monitors; Wireless routers; Server hardware; Charging stations; Peripherals
- Revenue: NT$230.2 billion (US$8.24 billion)
- Website: www.msi.com

Micro-Star International Co., Ltd. (MSI; Chinese: 微星科技股份有限公司) is a Taiwanese multinational corporation based in New Taipei City, Taiwan. The company designs, develops, and provides computer hardware, related products, and services. Its product lineup includes laptops, desktop computers, motherboards, graphics cards, all-in-one computers, servers, industrial computers, peripherals, and automotive infotainment systems.

MSI was founded on August 4, 1986, by Hsu Hsiang (Joseph Hsu), Huang Chin-Ching (Jeans Huang), Lin Wen-Tung (Frank Lin), Yu Hsien-Neng (Kenny Yu), and Lu Chi-Lung (Henry Lu). It is listed on the Taiwan Stock Exchange.

== Operations ==
First starting its business in New Taipei City, Taiwan, MSI later expanded into China, setting up its Bao'an plant in Shenzhen in 2000 and establishing research and development facilities in Kunshan in 2001. It also provides global warranty services in North America, Central/South America, Asia, Australia and Europe.

MSI's offices in Zhonghe District, New Taipei City, Taiwan, serve as the company's headquarters, and house a number of different divisions and services.

Manufacturing initially took place at plants in Taiwan, but has been moved elsewhere. Many MSI graphics cards are manufactured at its plant in mainland China.

The company has branch offices in the Americas, Europe, Asia, Australia and South Africa. As of 2015, the company has a global presence in over 120 countries.

MSI and Syrma SGS announced their collaboration to make laptops in Chennai on January 10, 2025. MSI will transfer technology to Syrma SGS for localized production in India.

== Products ==
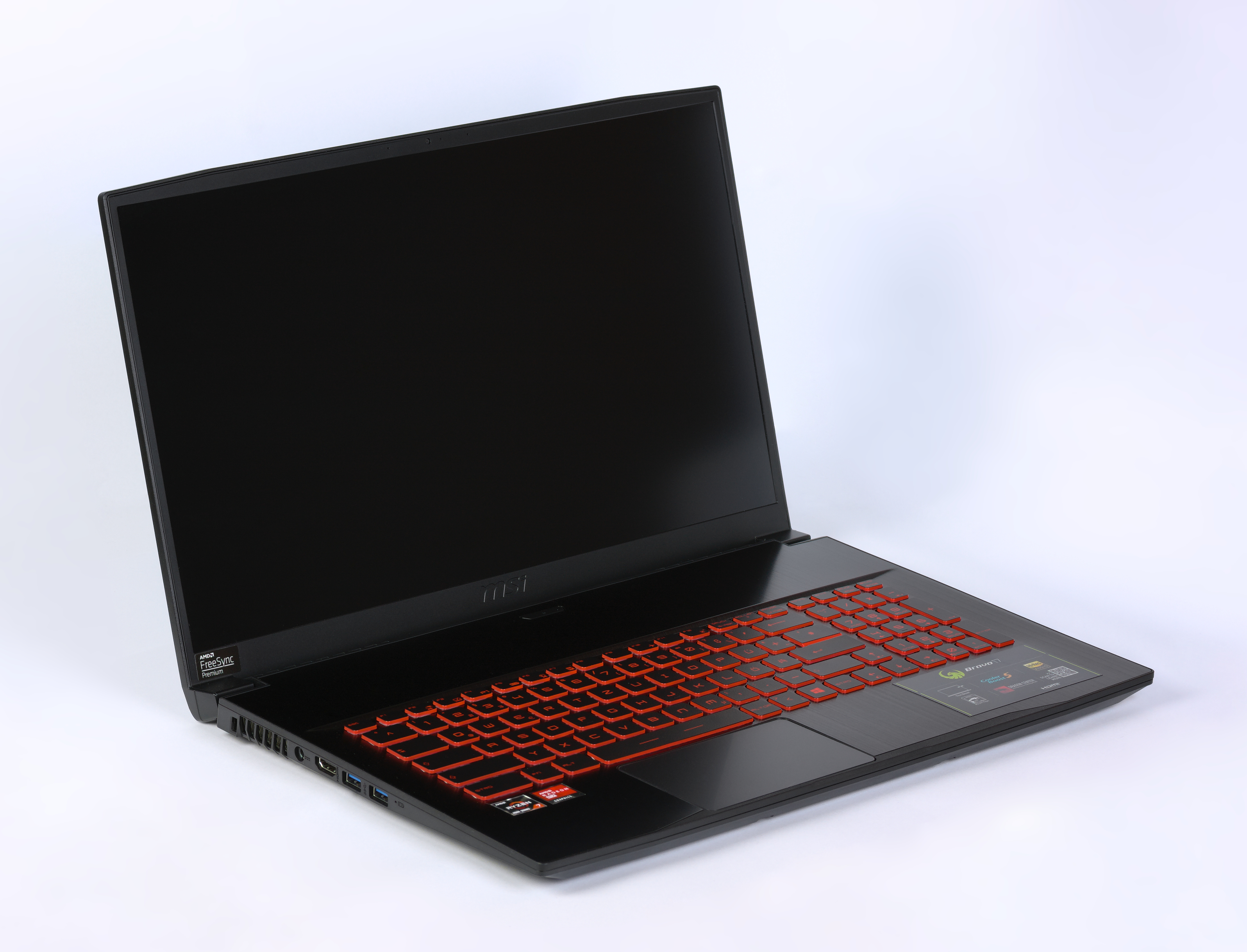
MSI Bravo 17 laptop

The company first built its reputation on developing and manufacturing motherboards for computers, and graphics cards. It established its subsidiary FUNTORO in 2008 for the vehicle infotainment market. It provides many computer and tech oriented products including laptops, desktops, monitors, motherboards, graphics cards, power supply units, computer cases and liquid cooler for gamers and content creators, all-in-one PCs, mobile workstations, servers, IPCs, multimedia peripherals, vehicle infotainment, and an autonomous mobility robot.

When established in 1986, MSI focused on the design and manufacturing of motherboards and add-on cards. Later that year, it introduced the first over-clockable 286 motherboard.

In 1989, MSI introduced its first 486 motherboard; in 1990, its first Socket 7 based motherboard; in 1993, its first 586 motherboard; and in 1995, its Dual Pentium Pro-based motherboard. In 1997, it introduced its Intel Pentium II-based motherboard with Intel MMX Technology, along with its first graphics card product and first barebone product. In 2002, it released its first PC2PC Bluetooth & WLAN motherboard.

In 2000, MSI introduced its first set-top box product (MS-5205); in 2003, its first Pen Tablet PC product (PenNote3100); and in 2004, its first Notebook product (M510C). In 2009, MSI introduced its first Ultra Slim Notebook (X320), and first all-in-one PC (AP1900).

MSI released their first digital audio player in 2003, in a line named MEGA.

In 2008, MSI sponsored Fnatic and dived into the PC gaming market. Its GAMING series features laptops, desktops, motherboards, graphic cards, all-in-one PCs, and gaming peripherals designed for gamers and power users.

The company has been a sponsor for a number of eSports teams and is also the host of the international gaming event MSI Masters Gaming Arena (formerly known as MSI Beat IT). The earliest Beat IT tournament can be traced back to 2010, featuring Evil Geniuses winning the championship.

In 2015, MSI teamed up with eye-tracking tech firm Tobii for the creation of eye-tracking gaming laptops.

In early 2016, MSI announced a collaboration with HTC and has revealed Vive-ready systems to offer Virtual Reality experiences.

MSI expanded its scope of business into Content Creation in 2018 and demonstrated creator-centric laptops at IFA 2018.

== History ==
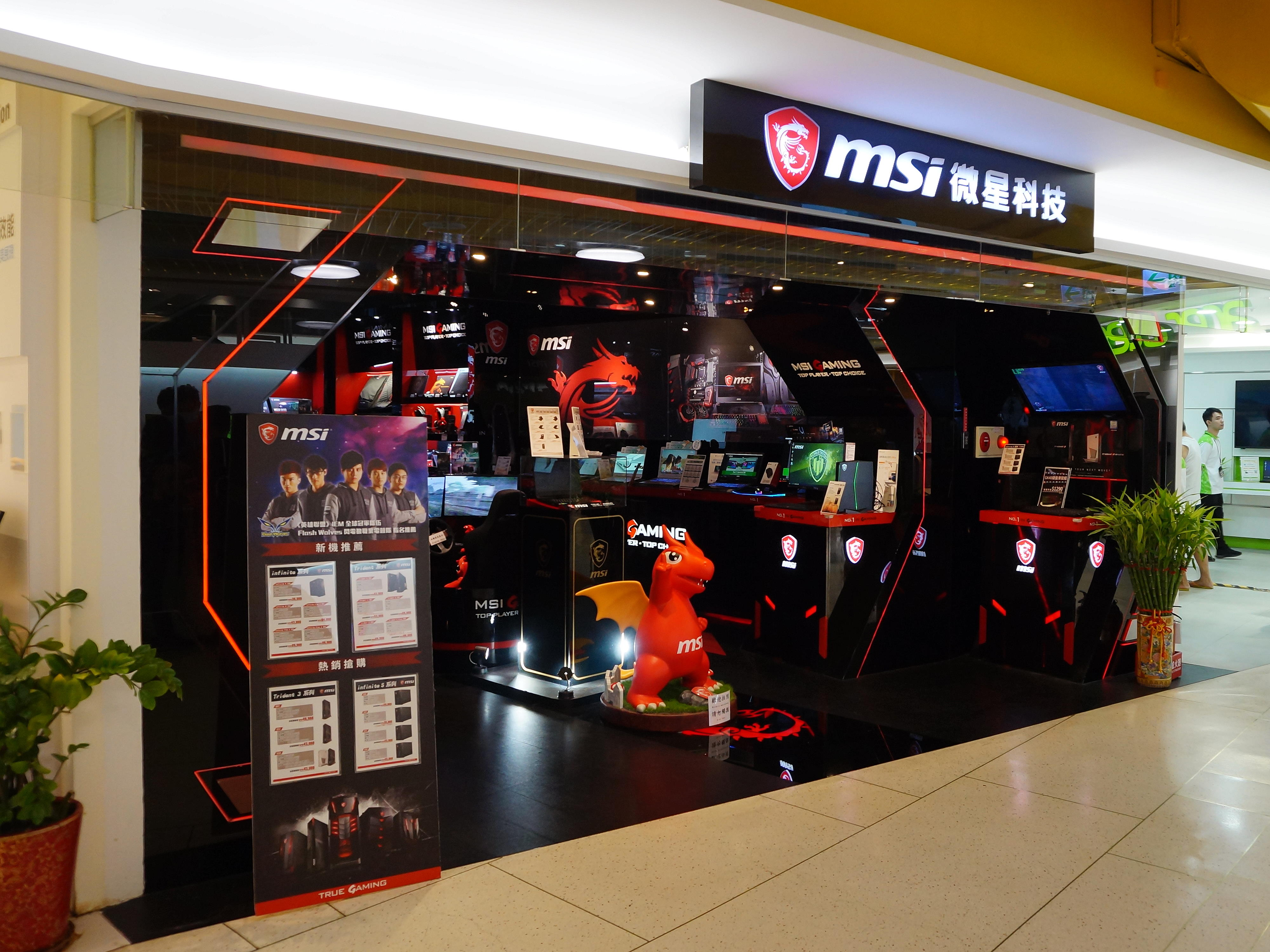
An MSI Store. The MSI dragon, Lucky, greets customers at the entrance.

In 2003, MSI released the "Mega PC", a shelf stereo computer hybrid with a front panel resembling the former and desktop computer connectors on the rear.

In 2017, MSI signed a laptop distribution deal with Mustek. In April of the same year, MSI names certified partners for the creation of an RGB ecosystem with MSI Mystic Light Sync which includes Corsair, SteelSeries, G.Skill, Cooler Master, InWin, Phanteks, and others.

Also April 2017, MSI launched "Join the Dragon" team sponsorship program to discover talented eSports teams. They have partnered with ESL for ESL One events in 2018 and became the official partner of ESL One Cologne 2018, one of the biggest events on the Counter-Strike: Global Offensive calendar. MSI sponsored the Method eSports organization in August 2018. MSI partnered with ESL to bring MGA 2018 grand finals to New York. Kazakhstan's AVANGAR won the Championship.

MSI and Ubisoft jointly presented Ambient Link (synchronized game lighting) on Assassin's Creed Odyssey and Tom Clancy's The Division 2 in 2019.

In September 2020, MSI unveiled a new line of business-oriented laptops under the "Modern", "Prestige", and "Summit" lines, and a new logo specific to these models.

Over the years, MSI has earned awards and recognitions, including being ranked among the Top 20 Taiwan Global Brands in 2008 and named one of the Top 100 Taiwan Brands in 2011. In 2015, Laptop magazine ranked MSI the fourth-best laptop brand of the year, and according to Topology Research Institute, MSI was the largest gaming laptop supplier worldwide in 2016. MSI had also been awarded the Taiwan Excellence award for fifteen consecutive years in 2013. In August 2018, MSI was rated the Best Gaming Laptop Brand of 2018 by Laptop Mag. New designs of its GS65 Stealth Thin and GE63 Raider RGB laptops earned the company an 84 out of 100 and put it on the top spot.

On 7 October 2020, MSI released a public statement about their subsidiary Starlit scalping MSI-made Nvidia GeForce RTX 3080 and 3090 graphics processing units (GPUs), and selling them for higher than MSRP on eBay.

During the 2022 Russian invasion of Ukraine, MSI refused to withdraw from the Russian market. Research by Jeffrey Sonnenfeld of Yale University put MSI in the Yale CELI List of Companies category of "Digging In - Defying Demands for Exit or Reduction of Activities", the only Taiwanese company in the database. MSI issued a statement on March 28, 2022, claiming that it abides by all international regulations in terms of its sales and operations in Russia.

At Computex 2023, MSI revealed a collaboration with Mercedes-AMG for a special edition of its Alpha 17 gaming laptop. This limited-edition model features design elements inspired by the AMG performance brand, integrating the aesthetics and luxury of Mercedes-AMG with high-performance gaming hardware. The partnership emphasizes both brands' focus on speed, precision, and cutting-edge technology.

In 2024, MSI Gaming Arena hosted a Dota 2 e-sports tournament in Southeast Asia. Teams were chosen through regional qualifiers for the online playoffs, which were scheduled from September 27 to October 6.

The Discovery documentary Esports: The Rise of the New King examines the rapid transformation of gaming into a prominent sport, premiering in August 2023. It focuses on MSI's contribution to esports, particularly in hardware and cooling technology, while also showcasing events like ESL One New York and the MSI MGA finals. The program highlights the role of PC gaming in driving hardware sales and the growing partnership between manufacturers and esports tournaments.

MSI introduced new server platforms powered by Intel's Xeon processors, featuring six performance cores for improved computational performance. These servers are designed to enhance AI, data processing, and cloud computing capabilities. The new platforms highlight MSI's focus on scalability and advanced technology for high-performance computing environments.

At the 2024 Taipei Auto Show, MSI unveiled a new range of smart electric vehicle (EV) chargers. The lineup features residential and commercial models, including the EV Life charger, which is compatible with both U.S. and European charging standards. MSI's commercial chargers offer payment options and advanced management features, such as parking management via license plate recognition. Additionally, the EV AI charger has been honored with a Taiwan Excellence Award.

== Sponsorship ==
The company once partnered with eSports teams Fnatic and Cloud 9.

It has also been a sponsor for a number of eSports teams worldwide, including METHOD, PENTA Sports, Energy eSports, HWA Gaming, yoe Flash Wolves, NXA-Ladies, Vox Eminor, DeToNator, Team Infused, Aperture Gaming, Phoenix GaminG, Karmine Corp, Aiolikos FC, etc.

MSI announced a partnership with Monster Energy Yamaha MotoGP in February 2022 to support the team with PC hardware throughout the MotoGP season.

== See also ==
- List of companies of Taiwan
