= Computer case screws =

Hardware used to secure parts of a PC to the case

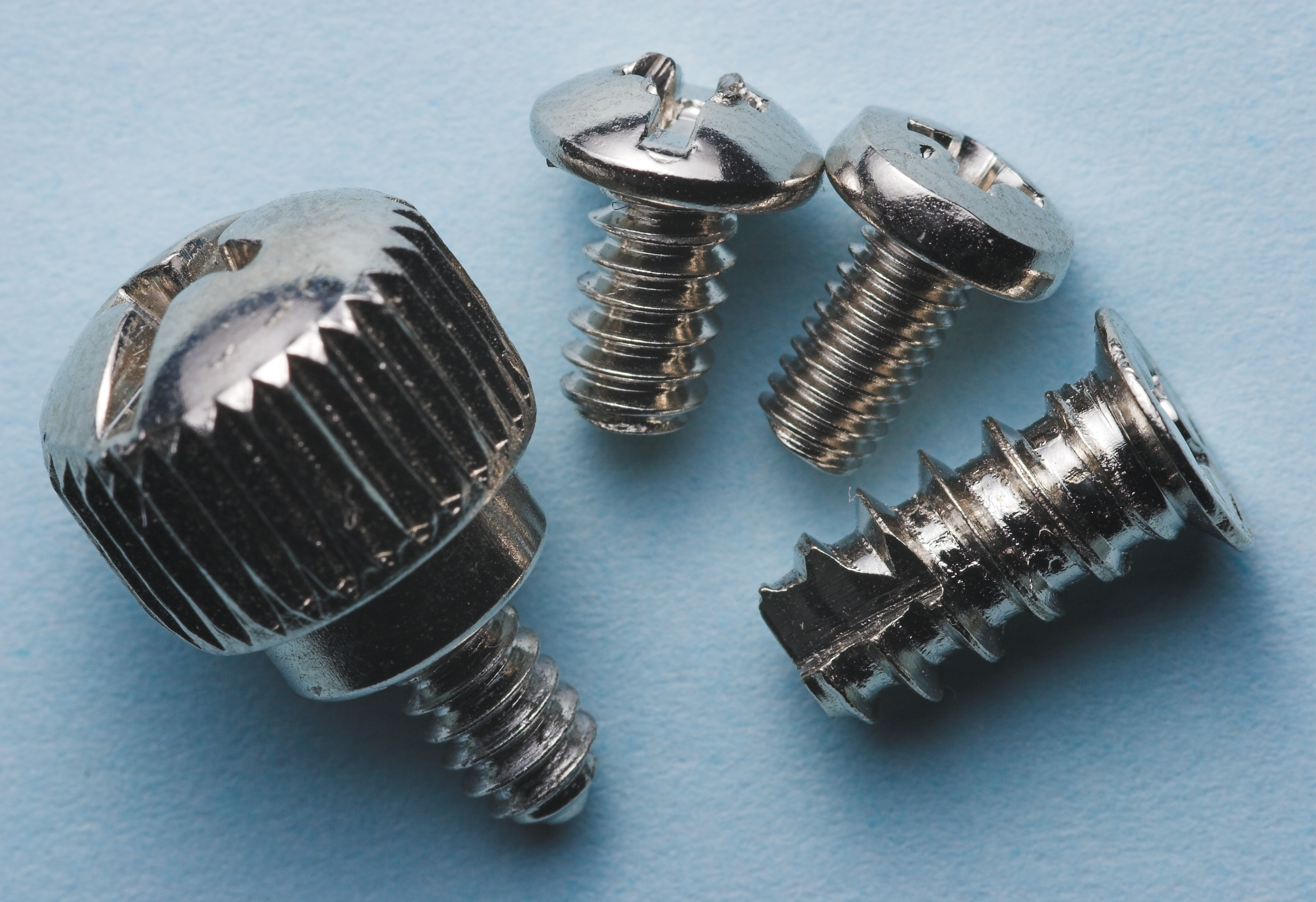
From left to right: a #6-32 UNC thumbscrew, a #6-32 UNC screw, an M3 screw and a self-tapping screw for case fans

Computer case screws are the hardware used to secure parts of a PC to the case. Although there are numerous manufacturers of computer cases, they have generally used three thread sizes. The Unified Thread Standard (UTS) originates from the United States, while the ISO metric screw thread is standardized worldwide. In turn, these thread standards define preferred size combinations that are based on generic units—some on the inch and others on the millimetre.

The #6-32 UNC screws are often found on 3.5" hard disk drives and the case's body to secure the covers. The M3 threaded holes are often found on 5.25" optical disc drives, 3.5" floppy drives, and 2.5" drives. Motherboards and other circuit boards often use a #6-32 UNC standoff. #4-40 UNC thumb screws are often found on the ends of DVI, VGA, serial and parallel connectors.

Some modern and enthusiast cases will lack screws altogether, instead utilizing a toolless design.

== #6-32 UNC screw ==
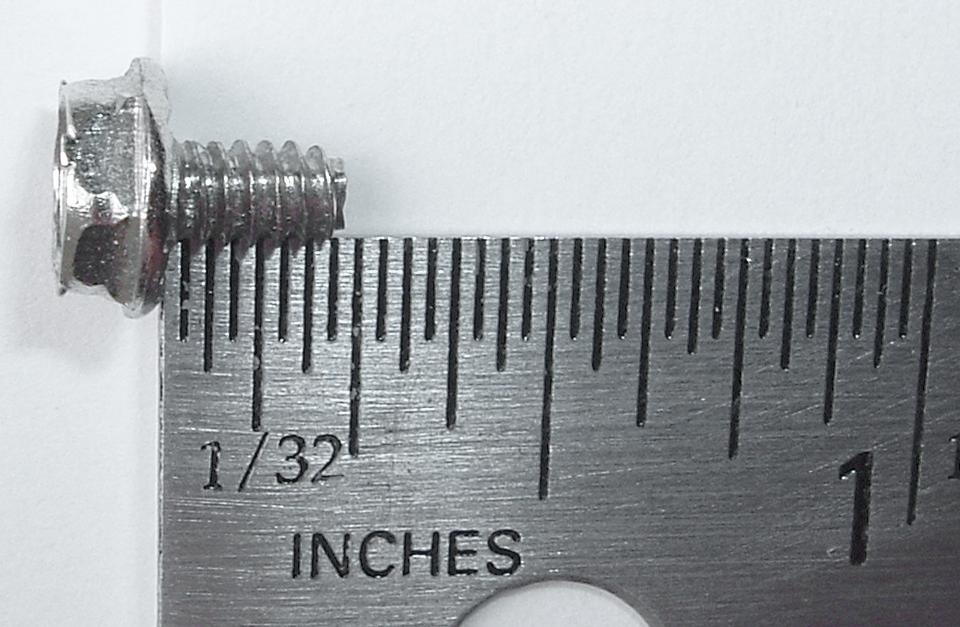
The #6-32 UNC screw has a thread pitch of 1/32 in (0.031250 inches (0.7938 mm)).

The #6-32 UNC is a UTS screw specifying a major thread diameter of #6 which is defined as 0.1380 inches (3.51 mm); and 32 tpi (threads per inch) which equates to a thread pitch of 0.031250 inches (0.7938 mm). The optional UNC specification indicates the standard coarse thread is used which is defined for #6 screws as 32 tpi rendering 'UNC' redundant, however it may be seen when other specifications such as plating or other treatments are also specified. It is by far the most common screw found inside computer cases. It commonly appears in lengths of 3/16 in (0.1875 inches (4.76 mm)) and 1/4 in (0.25 inches (6.4 mm)) or less often 5/16 in (0.3125 inches (7.94 mm)). Non-standard metricized lengths such as 5 millimetres (0.20 in) are also sometimes encountered. Nearly every brand new computer case comes with a bag of these. They are commonly used for the following purposes, however there are many exceptions:

- securing a power supply to the case
- securing a 3.5-inch hard disk drive to the case
- holding an expansion card in place by its metal slot cover
- fastening case components to one another
- usually, one or more #6-32 UNC screws hold the main cover on the case

They are almost always provided with a #2 Phillips drive. Sometimes a Green Robertson or Torx drive is used instead. All three patterns may also be combined with a slot for a flat-blade screwdriver. Usually they are provided with a 1/4 in (0.25 inches (6.4 mm)) flanged hex head. Non-standard metricized 5.5 millimetres (0.22 in) flanged hex heads can also be encountered. Also common are pan head screws - a low disk with a chamfered outer edge. Because they are used in places where high torque is not required and easy removal and replacement may be desirable (such as on the side panels of the PC case), they are frequently available as thumbscrews with larger, knurled heads that can be removed with one's fingers or tools.

== M3 screw ==
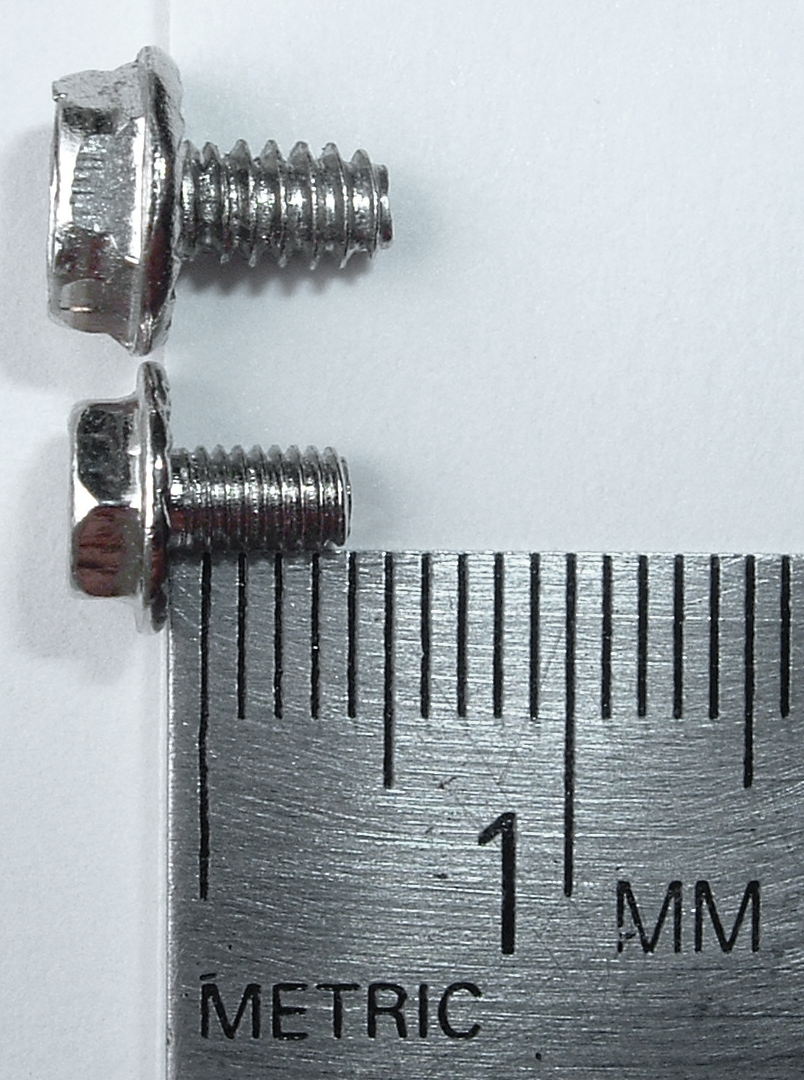
The bottom M3 screw has a finer pitch than the top #6-32 UNC screw.

The M3 is a metric screw specifying a nominal diameter of 3 millimetres (0.12 in); and standard coarse thread pitch defined as 0.5 millimetres (0.020 in). The M3 is the second most common screw found in PCs. It commonly appears in many lengths from 1 to 20 mm. Nearly every brand-new computer case comes with a bag of these. Notwithstanding many exceptions, they are commonly used for securing the following devices:

- 5.25-inch optical disc drives
- 2.5-inch hard disks and solid-state drive
- 3.5-inch floppy drives

M3 screws typically accept a #2 Phillips screwdriver tip.

== Motherboard standoff ==
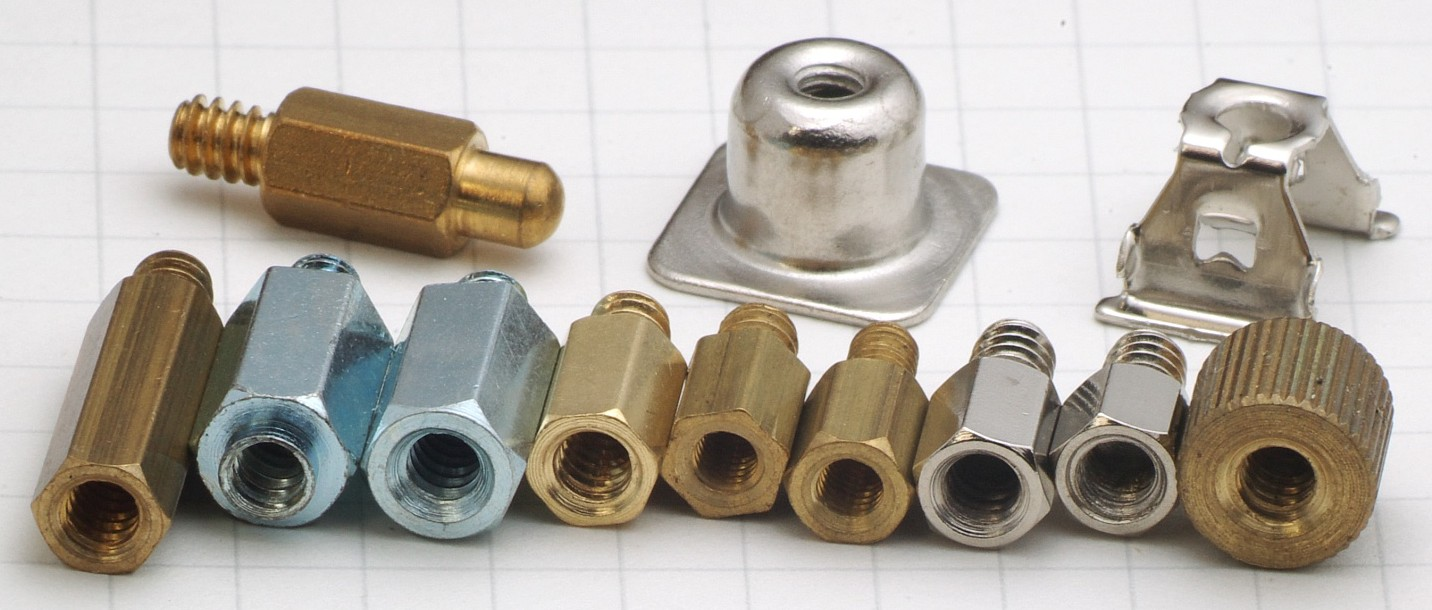
Various types of motherboard standoffs

Most cases use threaded brass standoffs (Jack Screw Standoffs) for attaching the motherboard to the case chassis. Because the case material is usually a conductive metal, attaching the motherboard directly to it can cause a short circuit. Sometimes threaded or snap-lock plastic standoffs are used, which are less secure, but equally useful in a stationary computer. The standoff provides a margin of space between the motherboard and the case to keep the multiple solder points below from grounding and short-circuiting.

Usually, the standoff has a #6-32 UNC male thread on one end which screws into a threaded hole in the case or motherboard backplate and a #6-32 UNC female thread in the other end which accepts a screw to retain the motherboard. Less often, the standoff has a female thread in both ends and a second screw is used to attach it to the case. Some standoffs use the M3 female thread (which faces the motherboard) instead of #6-32 UNC, and on a rare occasion a mixture of types can be used in the same case.

All-metric standoffs are stated as threading x hex length x threaded length. For example, M3 x 10 x 6 means a standoff with M3 male and female threading, 10 mm hex length, and 6 mm threaded length. M6 x 10 x 8 means M6 male and female threading, 10 mm hex length, and 8 mm threaded length. Typically, M2.5 and M3 standoffs tighten with a 5 mm socket, M4 standoffs with a 6 mm socket, M5 standoffs with a 7 mm socket, and M6 standoffs with an 8 mm socket, but this is not always the case.

Version 2.1 of the ATX specification states that the length of standoffs needs to be at least 0.25 inches (6.4 mm), with their cross sections fitting within 0.40 by 0.40 inches (10 mm × 10 mm) square areas centered around each mounting hole on ATX motherboards.

== #4-40 UNC jackscrews ==
Pairs of #4-40 UNC jackscrews are used to fasten certain connectors to hardware ports. These fasteners are typically located on either side of D-subminiature connectors, such as on VGA, DVI, serial, parallel and legacy game controller ports. The derivation of the customary term "jackscrew" in this context is unclear. The screws are typically thumbscrews, but may be slotted or Phillips drive, especially where permanent attachment is expected, or where the heads need to be lower-profile to save space.

=== Jackposts ===
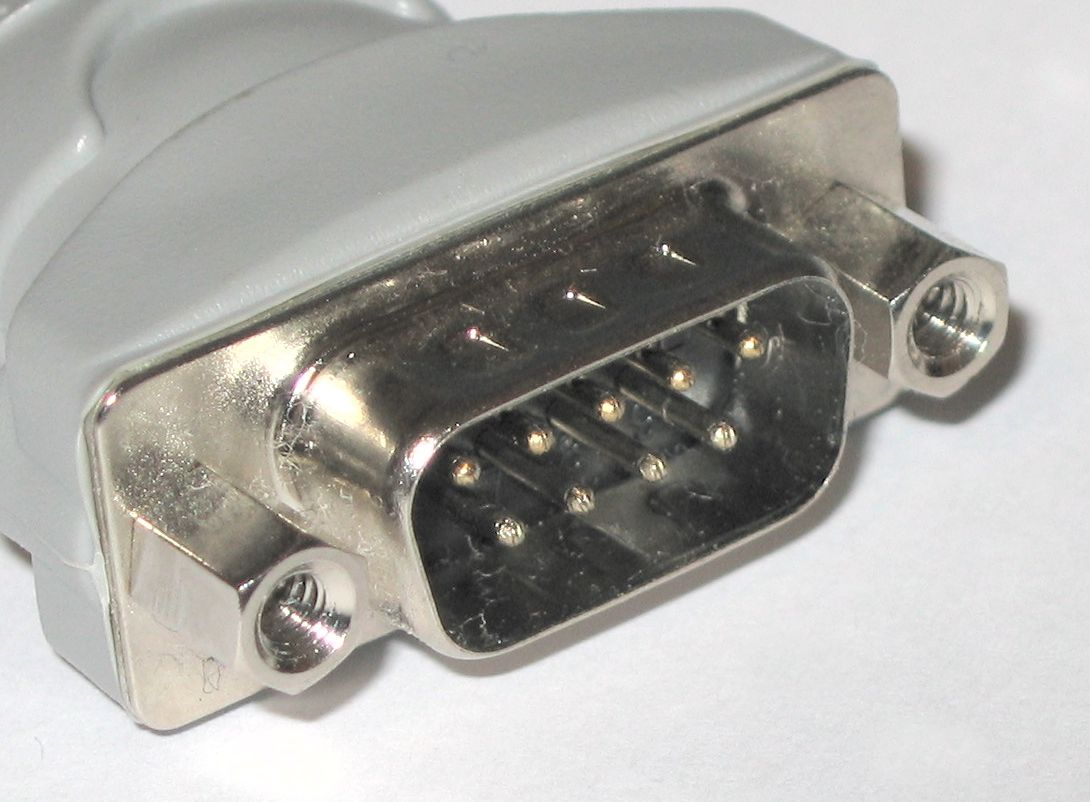
A male DE-9 connector showing hex jackposts on either side of the D-shell. Note the limited clearance.

Typically #4-40 UNC standoffs are used, which present the same #4-40 type female threading at their bolt end that they also screw into with their male end. These standoffs may also be called jackposts. They are similar but generally not identical to motherboard standoffs. The bolt end is typically hex-shaped, but may exceptionally be round to make removal more difficult. The hex diameter is 3/16", or 4.7mm. A 5mm hex socket might still fit, however where tightening or removal is required, care needs to be taken to select a nut driver with a sufficiently small outer diameter, as clearance between the jackpost and subminiature connector D-shell is limited. (A 9mm outer diameter should still fit, but 3/8" might already be marginally too big, depending on manufacturing tolerances.) The typical threading depth for #4-40 UNC jackposts used in PCs is 3/16" (0.1875 inches or 4.76 millimetres); the jackscrews that go into them are typically somewhat longer. The length of hexagonal jackpost heads can vary slightly, though pairs should be identical. Generally the D-shell stands somewhat proud of these hex bolts. Occasionally the #4-40 hexagonal standoffs come loose when loosening the #4-40 screws to remove a cable, gender changer, or adapter. Care should however be taken not to overtighten standoffs as they are somewhat delicate and will snap off at the base with excessive torque.

== Material ==
Steel is by far the most common material used, frequently with a plated or anodized finish. Other materials including brass, aluminum, nylon and various plastics are also used for applications with particular physical or aesthetic requirements.

== Comparison ==
The #6-32 UNC is a thicker screw with a more coarse thread. This makes it more suitable for fastening larger parts and thicker materials requiring increased holding strength. Its larger size and coarse thread make it easier to work with during assembly, with less risk of cross threading. The integrated flange provides greater holding strength with less risk of pull through. The hex head makes it easier to work with during assembly with powered torque screwdrivers.

The M3 is a thinner screw with a finer thread than the #6-32 UNC. This makes it more suitable for fastening into smaller parts and thinner materials requiring good strength in a limited space. Its size and fine thread make it appropriate for applications where a #6-32 UNC would be excessively bulky without providing any other benefits versus the smaller M3.

== Gallery ==
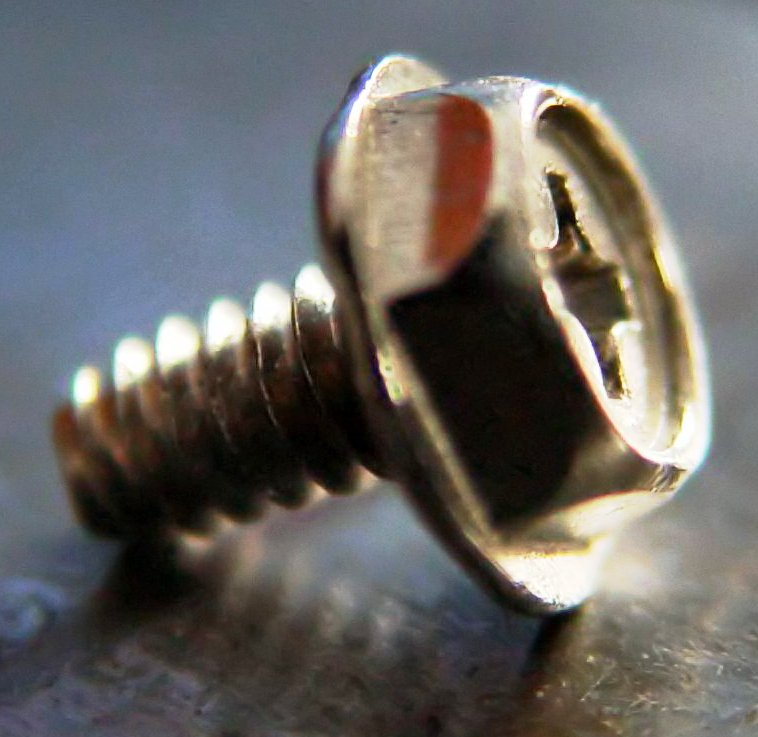
Close-up of a #6-32 UNC screw with a flanged hex/Phillips head, commonly provided in PC cases

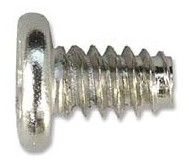
Close-up of a #6-32 UNC screw with a Phillips pan head, commonly provided in PC cases

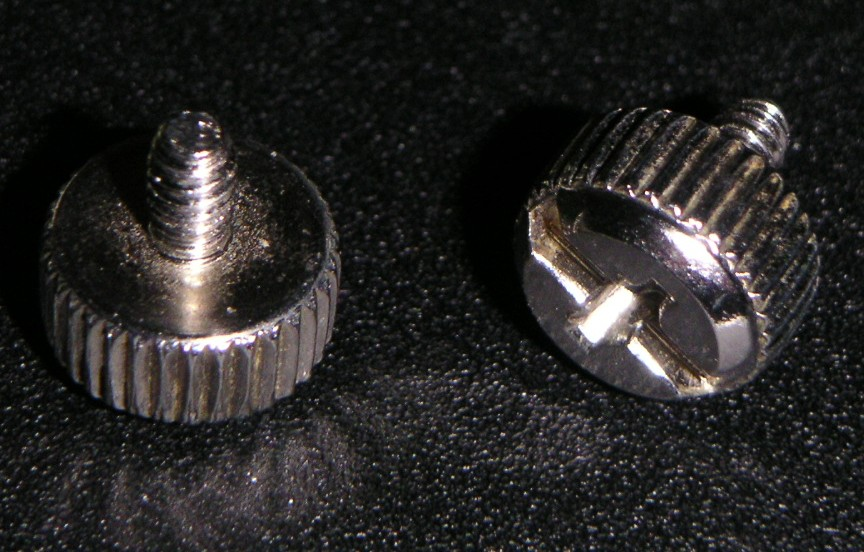
Thumbscrews from an ATX PC case

== Example ==
A regular computer case may require/include

- 7 thumb screw 6-32 × 6 mm for 2.5” drive tray, expansion slots
- 4 hexagon screw 6-32 × 6 mm for psu
- 21 phillips screw 6-32 × 5 mm for motherboard, 3.5” harddisk tray
- 12 phillips screw M3 × 5 mm for 2.5” harddrive
- 16 KB5 x 10 mm for fans
- 9 standoff 6-32 × 6.5 + 4 mm for motherboard
- 1 positioning standoff 6-32 × 6.5 + 4 mm for motherboard

== See also ==
- Torx
