= Phanteks =

Dutch company

- Industry: Computer hardware
- Founded: 2007; 19 years ago
- Headquarters: Netherlands
- Products: Computer cases Power supplies Computer fans Computer water cooling
- Website: www.phanteks.com

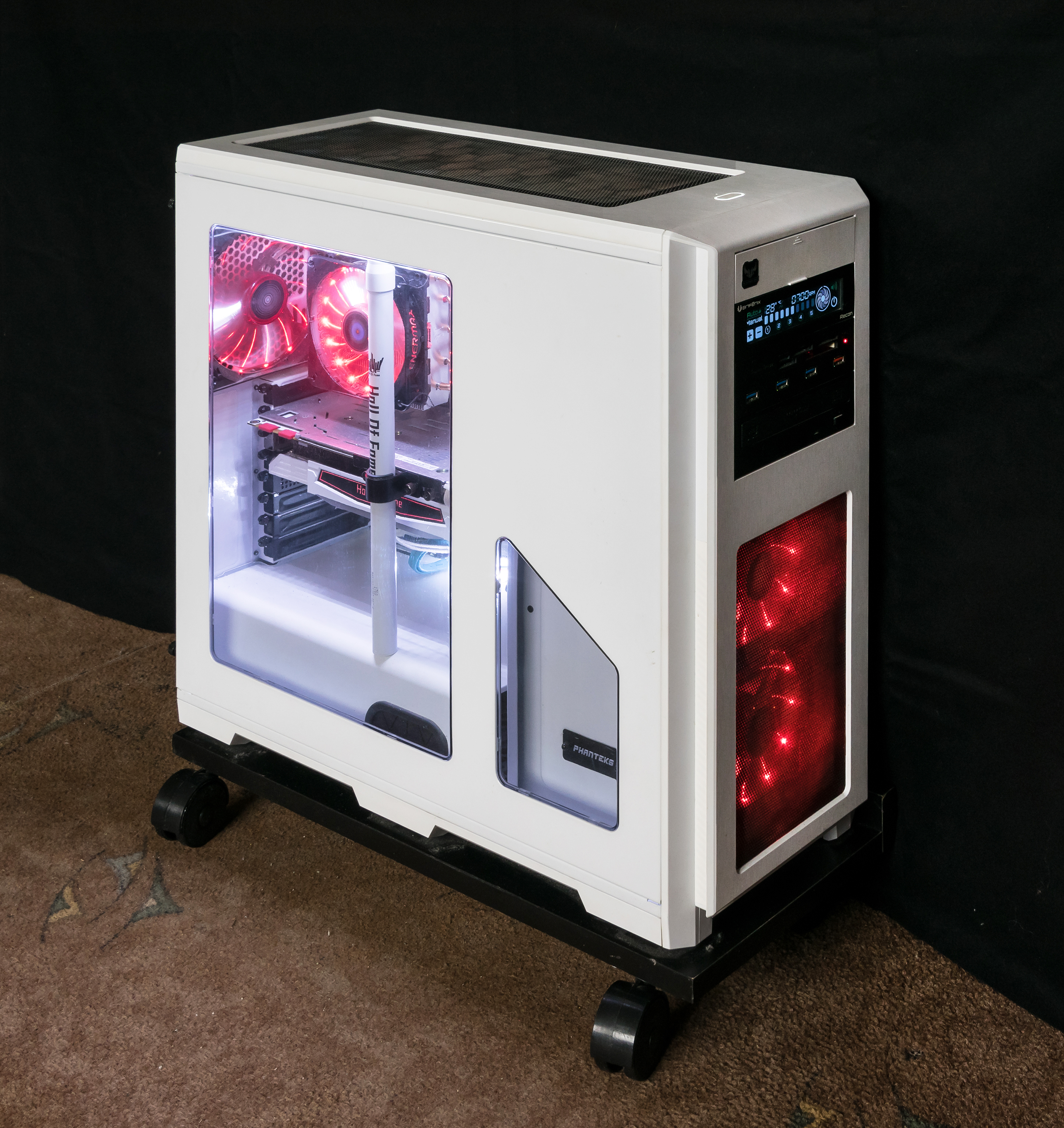
Phanteks Enthoo Pro case

Phanteks is a Dutch company which mainly produces PC cases, fans, and other case accessories. The company has a base in the United States.

== History ==
Phanteks's first product was the PH-TC14PE, a CPU cooler. Later, Phanteks started producing cases, beginning with the Enthoo Series.

== Products ==
The company produces several different versions of the Enthoo series and a few of the Eclipse series. It also supplies CPU coolers, fans, and accessories, liquid cooling blocks, and fittings. The Evolv X case was shown at Computex 2018, and chosen as one of the best products in its category by TechSpot. In partnership with Asetek, they produced All In One Liquid Coolers.

== See also ==
- Computer hardware
- Computer cases
