= In Win Development =

Taiwanese computer case company

In Win Development Inc.
- Trade name: In Win
- Type: Public (TWSE: 6117)
- ISIN: TW0006117005
- Industry: Computers
- Founded: 1985; 41 years ago in Taoyuan, Taiwan
- Founder: Vincent Lai
- Products: Computer cases; power supplies; IPC; Cooling
- Revenue: NT$4 billion (2008; US$124 million)
- Number of employees: 2,000 (2004)
- Website: www.in-win.com

In Win Development, Inc. (Chinese: 迎廣科技股份有限公司), formerly rendered as In-Win Development and commonly shortened to In Win or InWin, is a Taiwanese computer case and computer power supply manufacturer. In Win was founded in 1985 and has since opened multiple factories and headquarters internationally.

== Corporate history ==
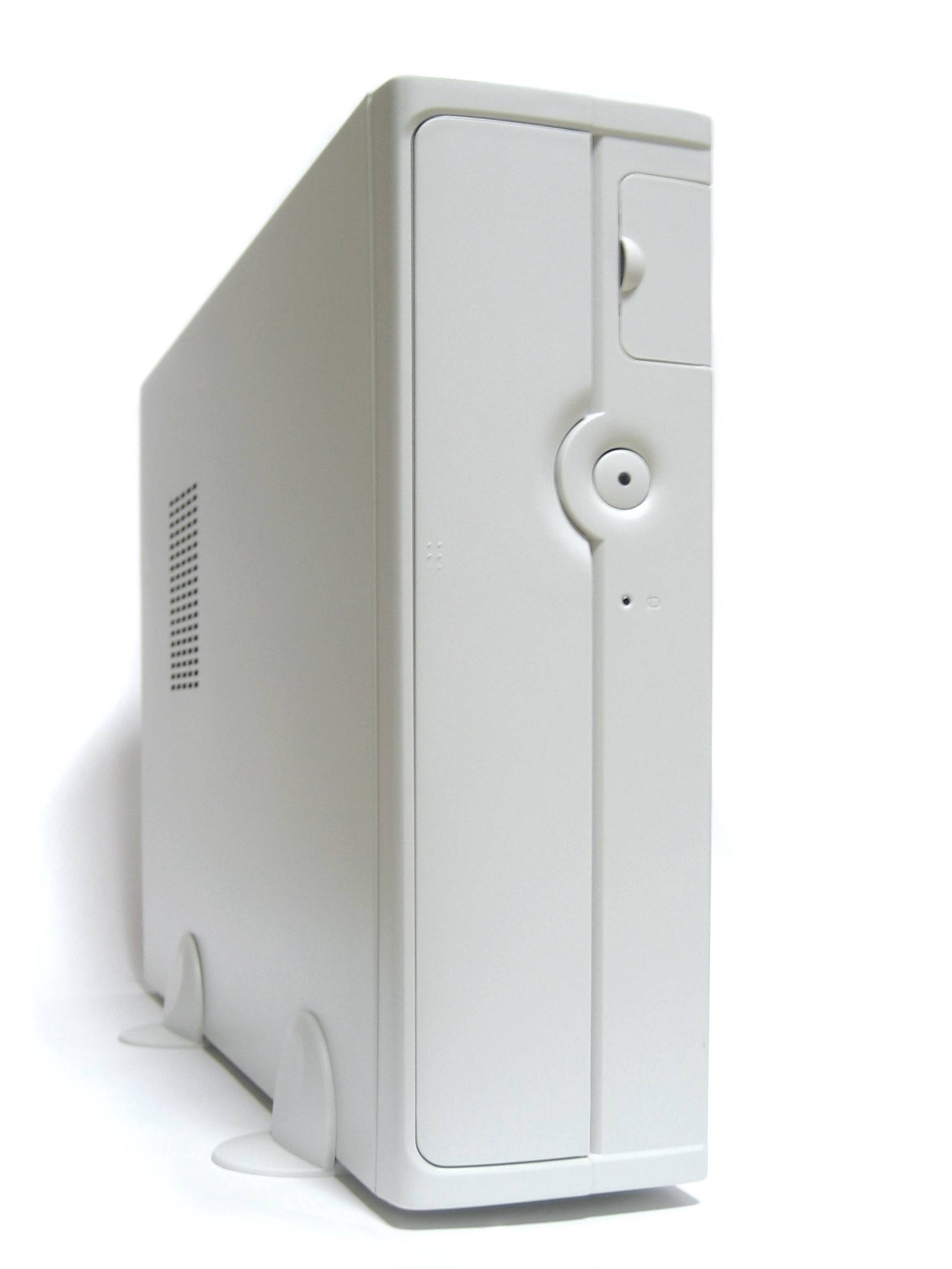
In Win BT553 small-form-factor desktop case

In Win Development was founded by Vincent Lai in 1985 in Taoyuan, Taiwan, with an initial investment capital of $200,000. Originally only a manufacturer of computer cases, In Win added power supplies production lines to its Taoyuan facility in the late 1980s and dabbled with manufacturing disk storage equipment and joysticks in the early 1990s.

In Win has four international branch offices between the United States, the United Kingdom, the Netherlands, and China. Europe and North America represented In Win's biggest importers of computer cases, purchasing respectively 40 percent and 30 percent of their output in 2004; the rest of their output was purchased evenly between outside territories—chiefly Asia, Africa, and the Middle East. Roughly 70 percent of the company's overall products were delivered to original equipment manufacturers and original design manufacturers, including Ingram Micro, Time Computer, Toshiba, NEC, and Intel.

In Win grew from having 60 employees in its Taoyuan facility in 1990 to 2,000 total employees globally on its payroll by 2004. Its engineering department staffed 80 employees in 2003; all engineers by that point had 15 to 20 years of hands-on and computer-aided experience designing cases. The software the engineers used to design cases at that point included AutoCAD, TurboCAD, Espirit, and Pro/E. The company planned to hire up to 500 more employees by 2005 and to open up a R&D laboratory in mainland China in 2004. Having established its American headquarters in the City of Industry, California, by the late 1990s, In Win leased another 50,000 sq ft office in a different part of the city in the fourth quarter of 2002.

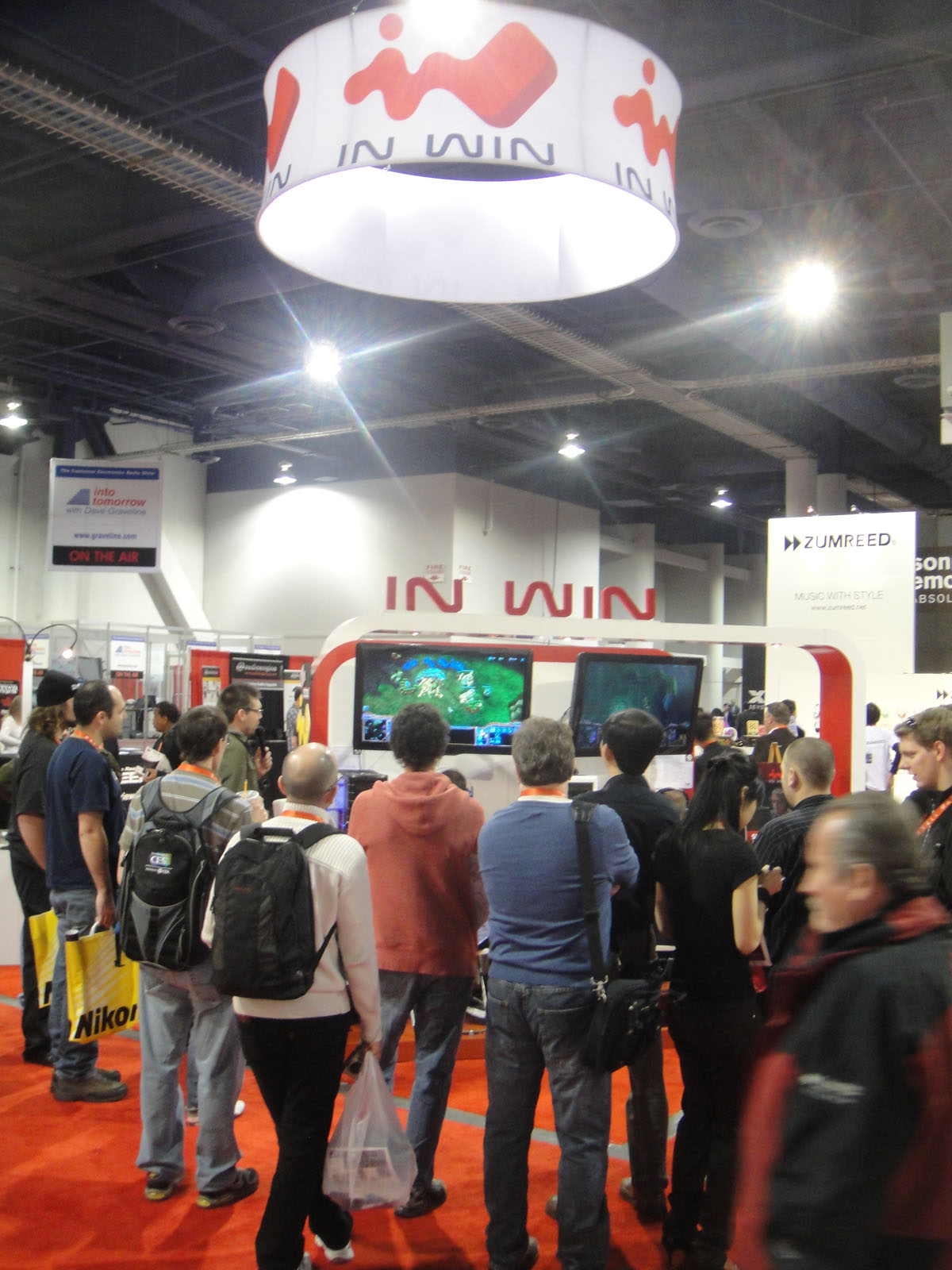
In Win's display booth at the Consumer Electronics Show in 2012

By 2012 the company began primarily targeting the video-gaming demographic, as well as PC case modders, (Note: To this end, some of In Win's cases lack built-in fans of any kind, with the expectation that the user will outfit it with powerful aftermarket fans or a water cooler (Staff writer 2017).) although OEMs and systems integrators both remained critical customers for the company into the 2020s. The company reached a peak revenue of NT$4 billion (US$124 million) in 2008. Sales dropped 47 percent through 2016 to $2.1 billion however.

In Win logo used since 2012 until 2018

In 2018, InWin unveiled a refreshed corporate logo and completed renovations of its Taoyuan headquarters building, marking a new chapter in its brand and infrastructure development. The company expanded its IPC system production lines and initiated construction of the Changxing II assembly factory to strengthen system production capacity. The Changxing II facility was completed in July, significantly enhancing manufacturing output. InWin also broadened its server integration services with the launch of its L11 solutions. Further extending its global footprint, InWin completed a system assembly factory in the United States in 2024 and established a dedicated ESG (Environmental, Social, and Governance) team to align with sustainable development goals. Construction of a new facility in Malaysia is underway, reinforcing the company’s ongoing ESG and international expansion initiatives.

== Manufacturing facilities ==
The company relies on steel imported from Japan and Taiwan for use in its mid- and mini-tower cases. Formerly outsourcing the injection molding of its plastic parts, In Win purchased plastic injection machinery for its own 4,600 m² Taoyuan factory between 1996 and 1997. (Note: For some intricate plastic and metal molds, In Win still relied on outsourcing in 2004 (Global Sources 2004, p. 60).) In 2000, it opened up a 17,480 m² plant nearby this factory in Taoyuan. Four final assembly lines 120 meters in total produced 16,000 cases per daily shift in 2004. In 2002, the company opened up a 202,400 m² factory in Mainland China. Initially meant for the production of In Win's computer cases, this factory branched out to providing mechanical and electrical manufacturing for systems integrators and OEMs. In Win planned to provide the same OEM services out of its Taiwan facilities by 2005. The company achieved a monthly production output of 350,000 and 400,000 PC and server cases by the end of the third quarter of 2004—70 percent of which comprising tower cases, 20 percent comprising desktop and small-form-factor cases, and 10 percent comprising server and other industrial cases.

== Products ==
In Win was noted for its ornate case designs of some models from the mid-2000s onward; for example, the company's GunDam case introduced in 2008 was inspired by the mecha franchise of the same name. Many of In Win's cases incorporate motherboard trays to facilitate upgrades and servicing. The company was also the first to incorporate USB-C ports on front panels for a barebones computer case.

Some of In Win's more elaborate cases include the H-Frame 2.0, designed around nine stacked sheets of aluminum sandwiched between tempered glass—allowing air to pass completely through the case—and the H-Tower case, which has mechanisms to open up the case via a button or a smartphone app. The company additionally sponsors PC modding competitions in the United States. In 2017, the company released another limited-edition case—quantity 200—made of cast aluminum and 5 mm-thick tempered glass, designed large enough to run extensive water-cooled setups.

In Win, as with several other computer case manufacturers, skipped over the proposed low-profile motherboard form factor NLX in the late 1990s, citing low demand. They embraced the contemporaneous microATX specification, however, and in the late 2000s designed a modicum of microATX cases designed with optimal airflow and other thermal considerations for Intel's Atom CPU family.

=== Reception ===
In Win's 901 mini-ITX case received generally positive reviews in Custom PC and Computer Shopper—the latter calling it "the rarest of things—a genuinely attractive PC case" but with "some annoyances", while the former deemed it "more of a lifestyle chassis than a high-performance one". Computer Shopper in particular praised the placement of its slimline optical drive slot underneath the power supply housing "so as not to spoil the case's smooth front" and wrote that the interior left plenty of room for large graphics cards but wrote that the matte plastic interior was vulnerable to scratching. Custom PC meanwhile found the case thermally problematic for CPUs and GPUs with the stock fans but said that aftermarket fans resolved this and were easy to install. The magazine also praised its cable management implements and wrote that the clearance for the power supply and GPU was "massive", albeit not spacious enough for large GPUs should a 120 mm water cooler be installed to the front intake mount.

Custom PC called the company's GT1 ATX case "rock-solid" in build quality but with "some sloppy design decisions", particularly regarding the front panel's cabling and the dust filters being made from "flimsy material rather than slide-out plastic". The reviewer called the interior "sensibly laid-out" and well-accommodated for cable management but found the drive cages' inability to be removed completely preventing it a 240 mm cooling radiator from being installed at the top of the chassis, although one cage could be slid out of the way for installing taller graphics cards.

In Win's Chopin line of small-form-factor mini-ITX cases were measured by Custom PC to be only slightly larger than the motherboard in surface area and requiring a custom power supply unit. The reviewer praised the build quality and quiet operation but noted that discrete GPUs were uninstallable due to its diminutive size.
