= LPX (form factor) =

Motherboard form factor

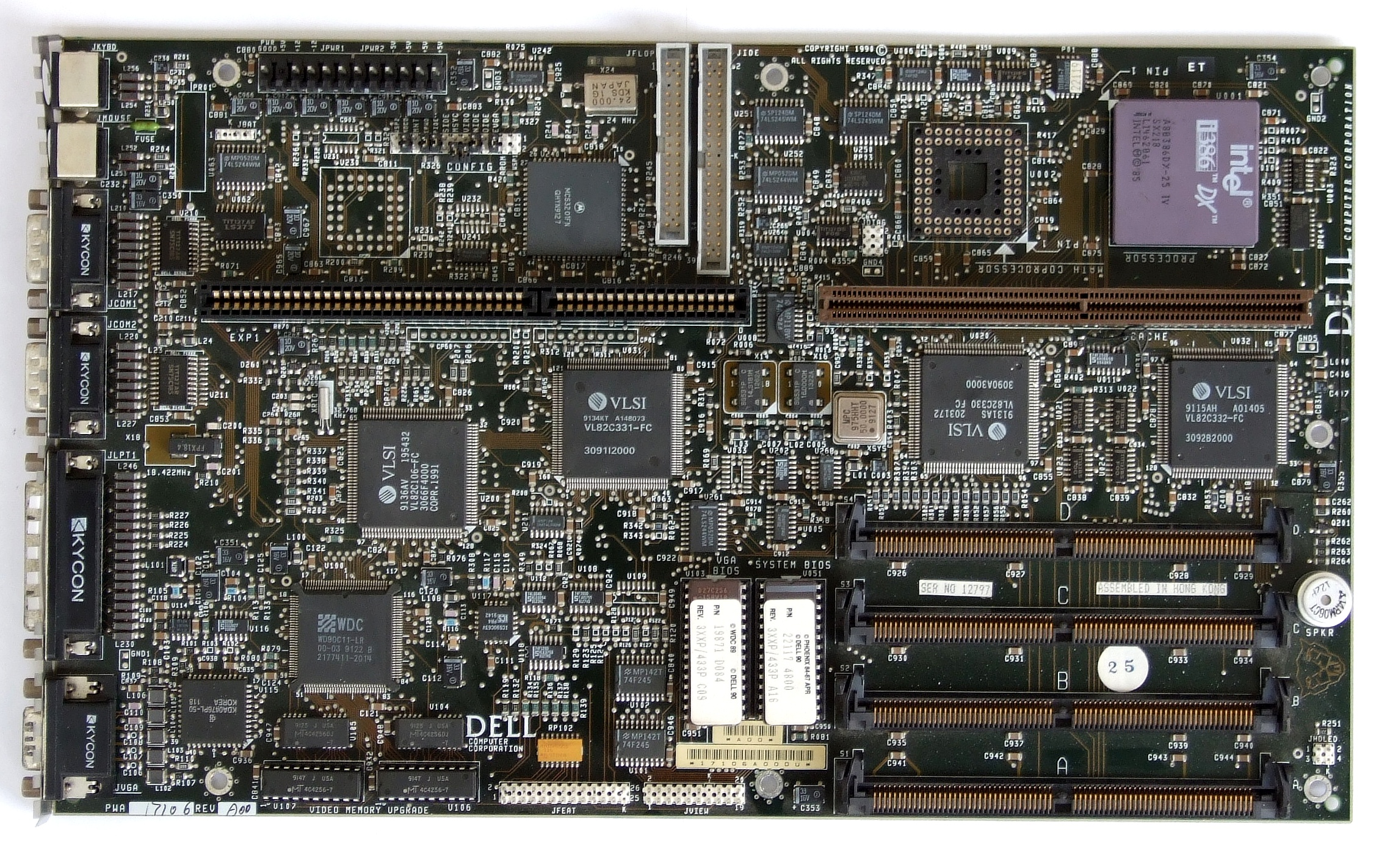
The motherboard of a Dell System 325P, sporting the LPX form factor; the socket for the riser card is at the top left

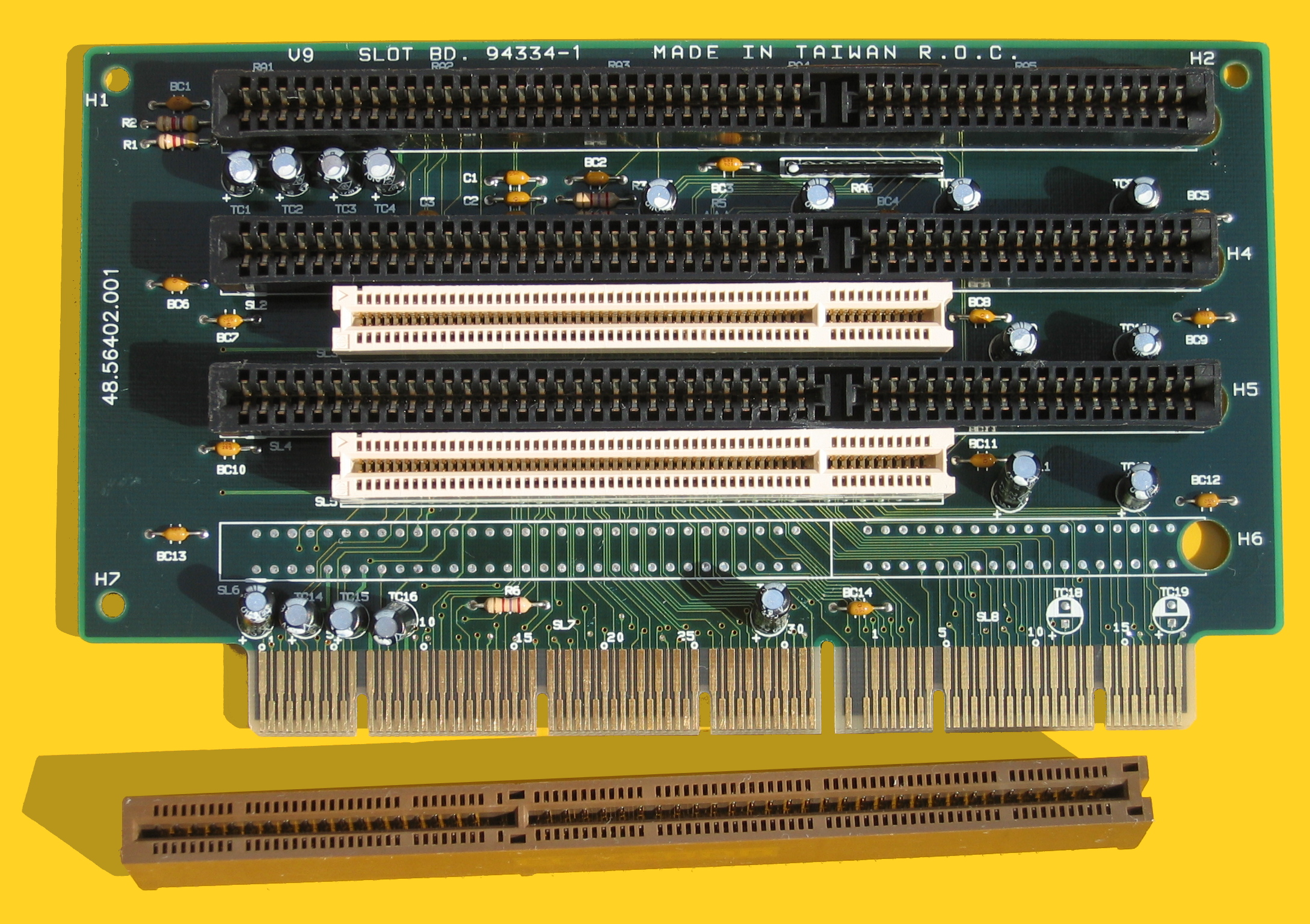
Typical LPX riser card, with connectors for PCI and ISA cards

LPX (short for low profile extension) was a loosely defined motherboard format (form factor) widely used from the late 1980s to the late 1990s. The format was originally developed by Western Digital who based their design off the IBM PS/2 Model 30. A defining feature of motherboards with the LPX form factor is the integration of controllers and ports, which used to be separate add-ons on the earlier AT and Baby AT motherboards, as well as riser cards and slimline power supplies. The use of a riser card to horizontally position expansion cards allowed computer cases designed around LPX motherboards to be much smaller than earlier AT-based cases.

== Overview ==
There was never any official LPX specification, but the design usually featured a 13 × 9 in (330 × 229 mm) motherboard with the main I/O ports mounted along the back edge (something that was later adopted by the ATX form factor), and a riser card in the center of the motherboard, on which the PCI and ISA slots were mounted. This layout was first used on IBM's PS/2 Model 30 personal computer, which Western Digital used as the basis for the creation of LPX. Western Digital's reference design was released as the WD30-WDM, unveiled in late 1987 and sold starting in spring 1988. A clone of the PS/2 Model 30's motherboard, it contains integrated parallel and serial controllers and ports, floppy and hard disk controllers, a VGA controller, and a three-slot 8-bit ISA riser card.

Due to the lack of standardized specification, riser cards were rarely compatible from one motherboard design to another, much less one manufacturer to another. The internal PSU connector was of the same type used in the AT form factor.

One of the more successful features to come out of the LPX specification was its use of relatively compact power supplies, which later became widely used on Baby AT and even full size AT cases. Since LPX form factor power supplies became ubiquitous in most computer cases prior to the ATX standard, it was not unusual for manufacturers to refer to them as "AT" power supplies (or occasionally as "PS/2" power supplies due to its use by the IBM PS/2), even though the actual AT and Baby AT power supply form factors were larger in size. The LPX form factor power supply eventually formed the basis for the ATX form factor power supply, which is the same width and height.

The specification was popular in the early-mid 1990s, and briefly displaced the AT form factor as the most commonly used. However, the release of the Pentium II in 1997 highlighted the flaws of the format, as a good airflow was important in Pentium II systems, owing to the relatively high heat dispersal requirements of the processor. LPX systems suffered a restricted airflow due to the centrally placed riser cards. The introduction of the AGP format further complicated matters, as the design not only increased the pin count on riser cards, but it limited most cards to one AGP, one PCI and one ISA slot, which was too restrictive for most users. Some lower-quality LPX boards did not even feature a real AGP slot, but simply used a physical AGP slot and connected it to the PCI bus. This was rarely noticed however, as many "AGP" graphics cards of the time were in fact PCI cards internally, and did not take advantage of the features offered by AGP.

LPX was phased out around 1998. NLX was the intended successor, though many manufacturers chose MicroATX or proprietary motherboard formats instead.
