= Riser card =

Type of printed circuit board

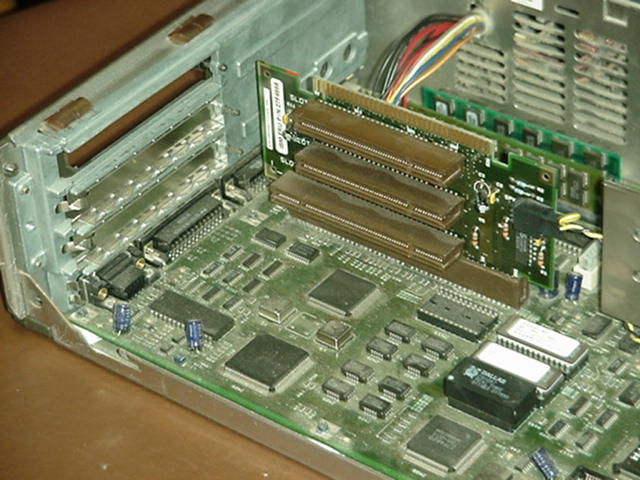
A riser card inside an IBM PS/2, featuring MCA slots

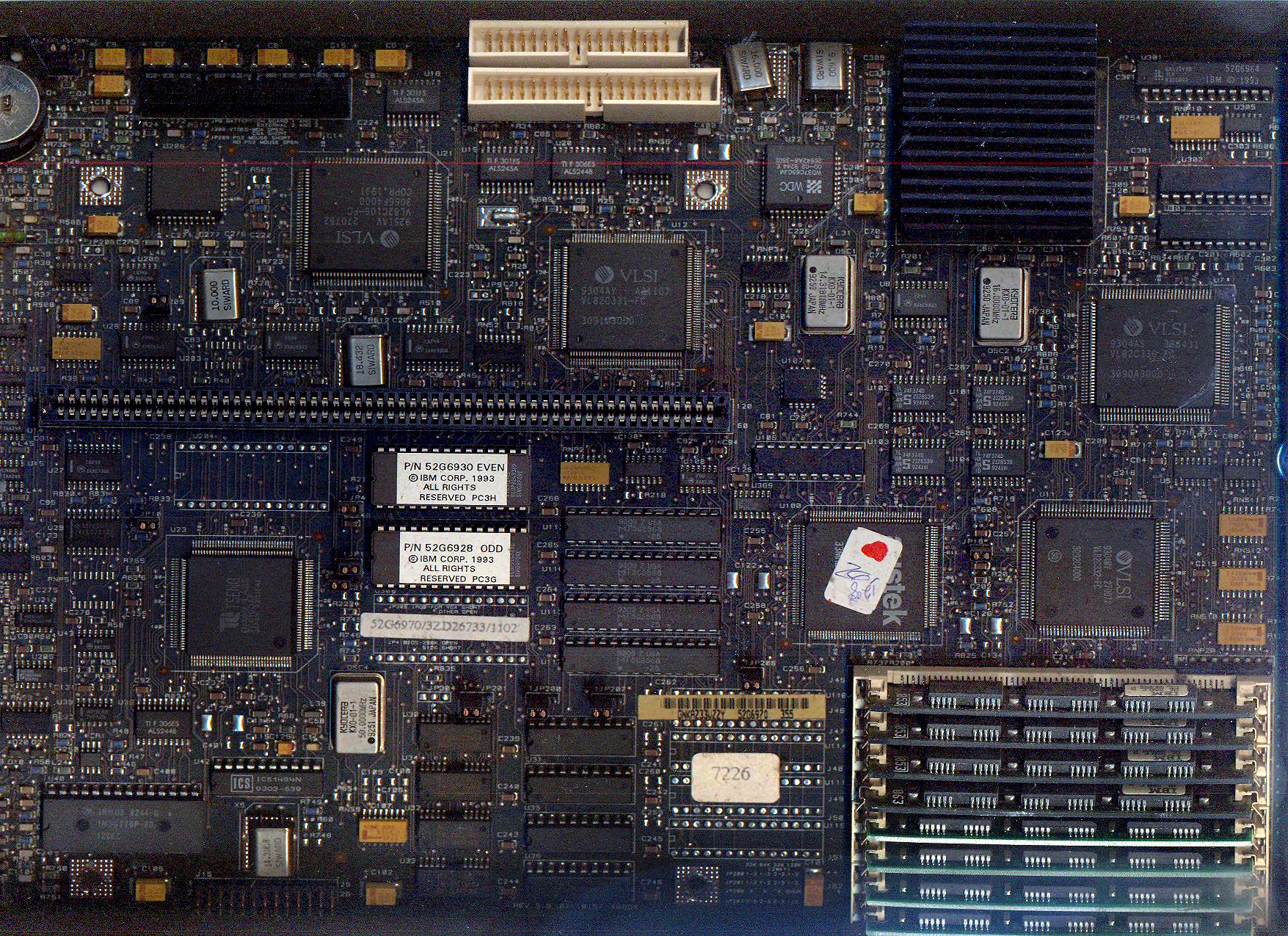
Motherboard of an IBM PS/ValuePoint personal computer model (c. from 1993 to 1995) with an Intel i486SX microprocessor, with an elongated connector (black, horizontally in the middle/left between upper and lower edge) for the riser card on which the ISA bus slots were located

A riser card is a printed circuit board that gives a computer motherboard the option for additional expansion cards to be added to the computer or for existing expansion cards to be mounted in a different location. A riser cable is a flexible design obtained by replacing at least some part of the board with a flexible cable, often a ribbon cable. (Note: A ribbon cable works over short distances, but suffers from excessive interference and loss at longer distances. A solution is to use twisted pairs, seen in some PCIe risers in the form of appropriated 8P8C (8 pins, 8 wires, 4 pairs), USB 3.0 (9 pins, 10 wires, 3 pairs), or USB-C ports (24 pins, 18 wires, 6 pairs).) A common setup includes one PCB with an edge connector on each side of the cable. They provide even more flexibility in positioning.

== Design ==
The simplest riser cards and cables are little more than extension cords. They are completely passive and feature the same connector of different genders on each end. Alternatively, they can act as adapters between two electrically-compatible connectors.

Slightly more complicated are passive splitter cards (veering into the territory of daughterboards), which allow multi-lane slots to be split into several slots. For example, a PCI Express x16 slot can be split into two x8 slots by wiring the power pins in parallel and splitting the data pins. (Note: Some PCIe risers power the additional slots from a separate modular power connector so as to allow a full 75W power to every port.) A motherboard or other kind of PCIe controller supporting bifurcation will detect the setup and handle the devices accordingly. Up to x4+x4+x4+x4 bifurcation is available on some 2020s consumer motherboards. (Again, they can also function as adapters: a x16 PCIe slot can be split into four M.2 M-key slots, for example.)

Active risers are used whenever a purely passive design will not suffice. For example, on motherboards that do not support bifurcation, a riser card with a PCIe switch can achieve the effect by handling the bifurcation itself. A switch can (theoretically) handle a larger number devices as well as allow each attached device to use up to the full x16 bandwidth so long as there is spare bandwidth on the uplink side. The downside lies in the cost and the added latency.

== Applications ==
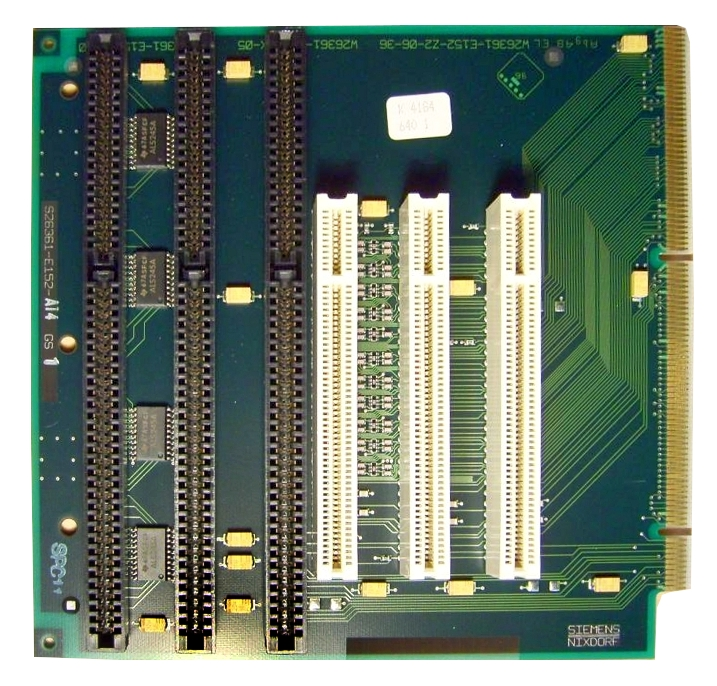
Riser card with three ISA bus and three PCI slots from a Siemens-Nixdorf PC Scenic M5, c. 1996

Riser cards have applications in both industrial and consumer spaces. They are used in large computers such as servers as well as small-form-factor computers. In both cases, the goal is to make better use of the space and cooling available by rotating the slots.

=== Servers ===
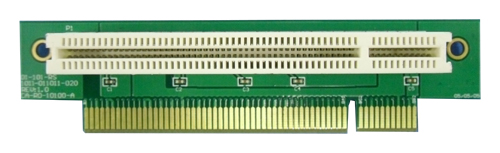
1U 1-slot 32-Bit PCI Riser Card

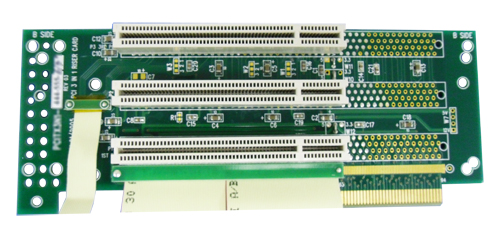
2U 3-slot 32-Bit PCI Riser Card

In servers, height for expansion cards is limited by rack units. A unit (U) is the traditional measurement used for server height. One server unit is equal to 1.75", 2U servers are 3.5", and so forth. Typical 1U riser cards each fit 1 PCI or PCIe slot, and 2U riser cards can fit 2 or 3 PCI or PCIe slots.

Modern PCIe-enabled servers commonly have two or more PCI-E x16 slots arranged in-line to feed one 2U riser card. There is no commonly-accepted standard for how far the slots should be spaced relative to each other, so each manufacturer uses their own design. As a result, multi-slot server riser cards are specific to the brand of the motherboard.

=== Small form factor PC ===
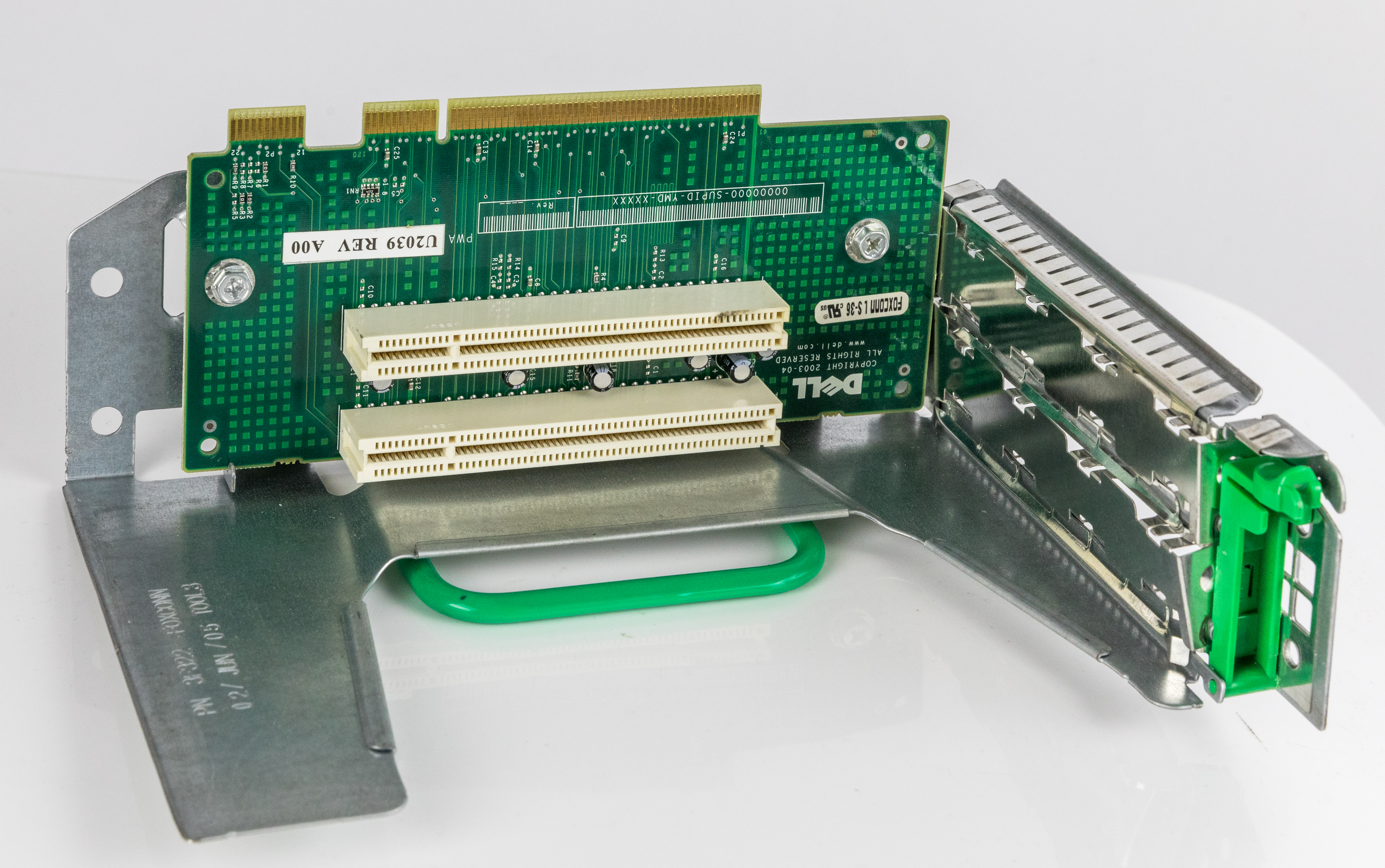
2-slot 32-Bit PCI Riser Card used to deploy full-sized PCI cards in a slim case

Small form factor PCs are extremely limited in terms of space. PCI-E risers are very commonly used to allow GPUs to be put in orientations other than the standard perpendicular-to-motherboard position.

- A riser board allows a GPU to lie flat in front of a mainboard, a kind of "sandwich" setup. The 1U boards used are the same as those used for servers.
- A riser cable can bend around and allow a GPU to lie flat behind the motherboard, another "sandwich" setup. This setup provides improved cooling compared to the previous one as the CPU fan and the GPU fans each have unimpeded access to air.
- A riser cable can also allow a GPU to lie alongside the motherboard to fit in a thin chassis.

A riser is usually connected to the mainboard's slot through an edge connector, though some, such as NLX and Next Unit of Computing Extreme, instead are plugged into an edge connector on the mainboard itself.

== Standardization ==
Riser cards are largely not standardized. They generally claim to respect the standard that they use, such as PCI Express edge connectors (16 lanes of data with 75W of power), ExpressCard, and PCI-X.

The lack of standardization has led to incompatibilities between multi-slot PCIe riser cards used by servers. There are standardized alternative electrical connectors that can be (and has been) used to make riser cables such as SFF-TA-1001 (U.2/U.3), at a measly x4 width. MCIO introduced a connector with x4, x8, or x16 width, now standardized as SFF-TA-1016. The M-XIO specification defines ways to transfer PCIe over SFF-TA-1016, SFF-TA-1026, and SFF-TA-1033.

== History ==
The first computer system to use a riser card on its motherboard was IBM's Personal System/2 Model 30, introduced in 1987. It was originally the lowest-end entry in IBM's PS/2 and thus featured slots for Industry Standard Architecture (ISA) cards. In the same year, Western Digital adopted the riser card design of the Model 30 for their Low Profile eXtension standard for motherboard layouts, leading to the proliferation of riser cards in IBM PC–compatible computer systems.

== See also ==
- Daughterboard
