= IBM PS/2 Model 30 =

1987 IBM desktop computer

Personal System/2 Model 30; Personal System/2 Model 30 286

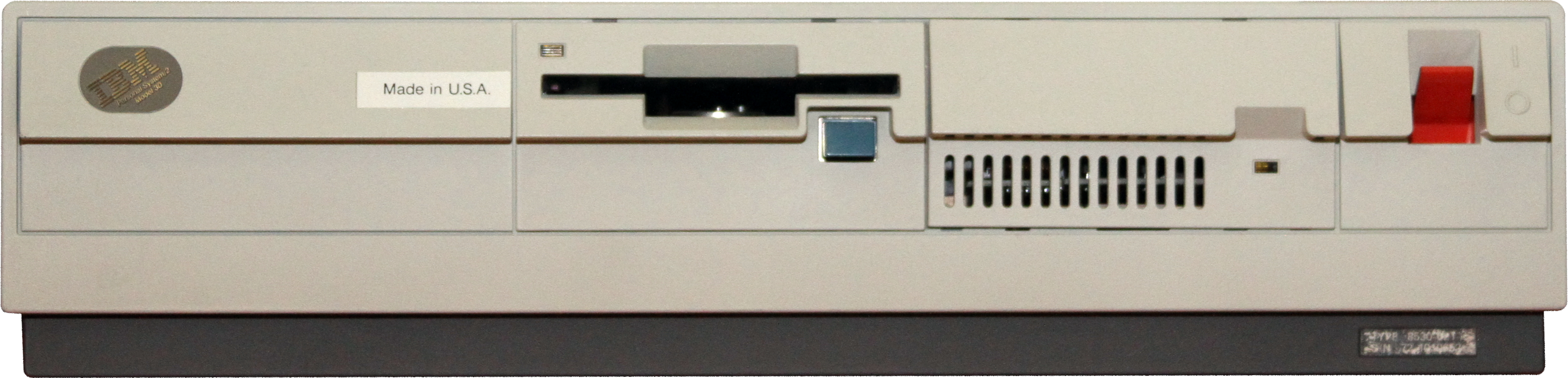
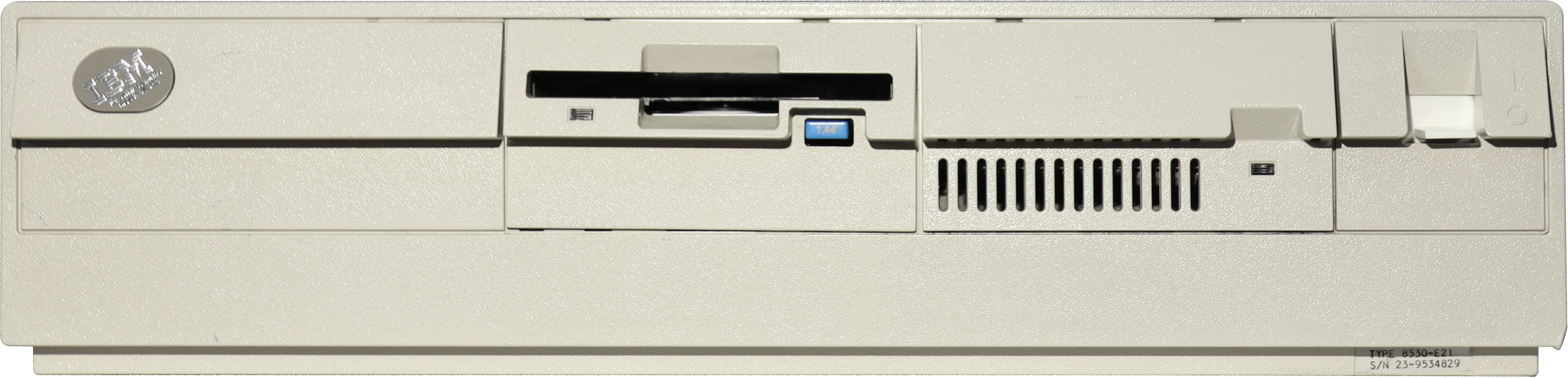
- Model 30 Model 30 286
- Developer: International Business Machines Corporation (IBM)
- Manufacturer: IBM
- Product family: Personal System/2
- Type: Desktop computer
- Released: April 2, 1987; 39 years ago (Model 30); September 13, 1988 (Model 30 286)
- Media: 720 KB 3.5-in floppy disks (Model 30); 1.44 MB 3.5-in floppy disks (Model 30 286)
- CPU: Intel 8086 at 8 MHz (Model 30); Intel 80286 at 10 MHz (Model 30 286)
- Memory: 640 KB (Model 30); 512 KB – 16 MB (Model 30 286)
- Storage: 20–40 MB hard drive (optional)
- Graphics: Multi-Color Graphics Array (Model 30); Video Graphics Array (Model 30 286)
- Power: 120/240 VAC
- Dimensions: 16" × 15.5" × 4" (407 mm × 394 mm × 102 mm)
- Weight: 15.7 lb (7.1 kg)
- Predecessor: Personal Computer XT; Personal Computer AT
- Successor: PS/2 Model 35 SX; PS/2 Model 40 SX
- Related: List of IBM PS/2 models

IBM PS/2 Model 30 286 audio sample
Power-on self-test, bootstrapping, and power-off

The Personal System/2 Model 30 and Personal System/2 Model 30 286 are IBM's entry-level desktop computers in their Personal System/2 (PS/2) family of personal computers. As opposed to higher-end entries in the PS/2 line which use Micro Channel bus architecture, the Model 30 features the Industry Standard Architecture (ISA) bus, allowing it to use expansion cards from its direct predecessors, the PC/XT and the PC/AT. The original PS/2 Model 30, released in April 1987, is built upon the Intel 8086 microprocessor clocked at 8 MHz and features the 8-bit ISA bus; the Model 30 286, released in September 1988, features the Intel 80286 clocked at 10 MHz and includes the 16-bit ISA bus.

IBM succeeded the Model 30 and Model 286 with the Personal System/2 Model 35 and Personal System/2 Model 40 subfamilies. Like their predecessors, the PS/2 Model 35 and PS/2 Model 40 use the ISA bus and were intended as entry-level models.

== Development and release ==
The PS/2 Model 30 was introduced on April 2, 1987, alongside the Model 50 and Model 60—entries in the PS/2 line which feature the new Micro Channel architecture bus, as opposed to the Model 30's Industry Standard Architecture bus previously used in IBM's PC/XT. The Model 30 is the most entry-level in the PS/2 lineup, with the dual-floppy-drive unit costing US$1,695 and the floppy–hard drive combo unit costing US$2,295—compared to $3,595 for the basic Model 50. With a variant of the Intel 8086 microprocessor clocked at 8 MHz, the Model 30 is rated roughly two-and-a-half times faster than its predecessors, according to IBM, while occupying a chassis roughly half the size. The Model 30 marks the first time IBM used this variant, known as the 8086-2, in a PC.

Manufacturing of the Model 30 was initially performed at IBM's facility in Boca Raton, Florida, by a core team of around 50 workers. IBM's engineers consolidated several off-the-shelf chips from their previous PCs into VLSI packages and designed the system board to take surface-mount devices—two strategies in wide use among expansion card manufacturers by the time of the Model 30's release. On launch day, 70,000 units of the entire PS/2 line—including the Model 30—were delivered to IBM dealers in the United States. In June 1987, manufacturing of the Model 30 was moved to Raleigh, North Carolina, with IBM offering all of the core team the option to transfer to the Raleigh facility. Computer industry analysts speculated that this relocation was to free up production lines of a newer, more advanced entry in the PS/2 family, at Boca Raton, where the Models 50, 60, and 80 were also being made. The Raleigh plant manufactured 2,000 Model 30s daily in June 1987, compared to 1,000 Model 50s and 800 Model 60s produced daily simultaneously in Boca Raton.

IBM introduced "financial workstation" versions of the Model 30 in November 1987. These Model 30s were intended for bank tellers and came packaged with a 50-key function keypad.

On September 13, 1988, IBM launched the PS/2 Model 30 286, which features the Intel 80286 microprocessor, clocked at 10 MHz. Per the updated microprocessor's 16-bit external data bus, the Model 30 286 also sports 16-bit AT bus expansion slots, allowing the computer to use expansion cards designed for the PC/AT; the original Model 30 has 8-bit ISA slots as used in the PC/XT. On announcement, the maximum amount of RAM was bumped from 640 KB to 16 MB—the maximum addressable amount for an 80286 processor. Additionally the integrated graphics chip and port were made VGA—a graphics chip standard which IBM introduced with the higher-end entries of the PS/2 line. The Model 30 286 marks IBM's return to the AT-compatible PC market, which IBM had invented with the release of the PC/AT in 1984. For seventeen months between the discontinuation of the PC/AT and the introduction of the Model 30 286, IBM offered no products with 16-bit ISA slots. Like the Model 30 before it, the Model 30 286 was also manufactured in Raleigh.

== Specifications ==
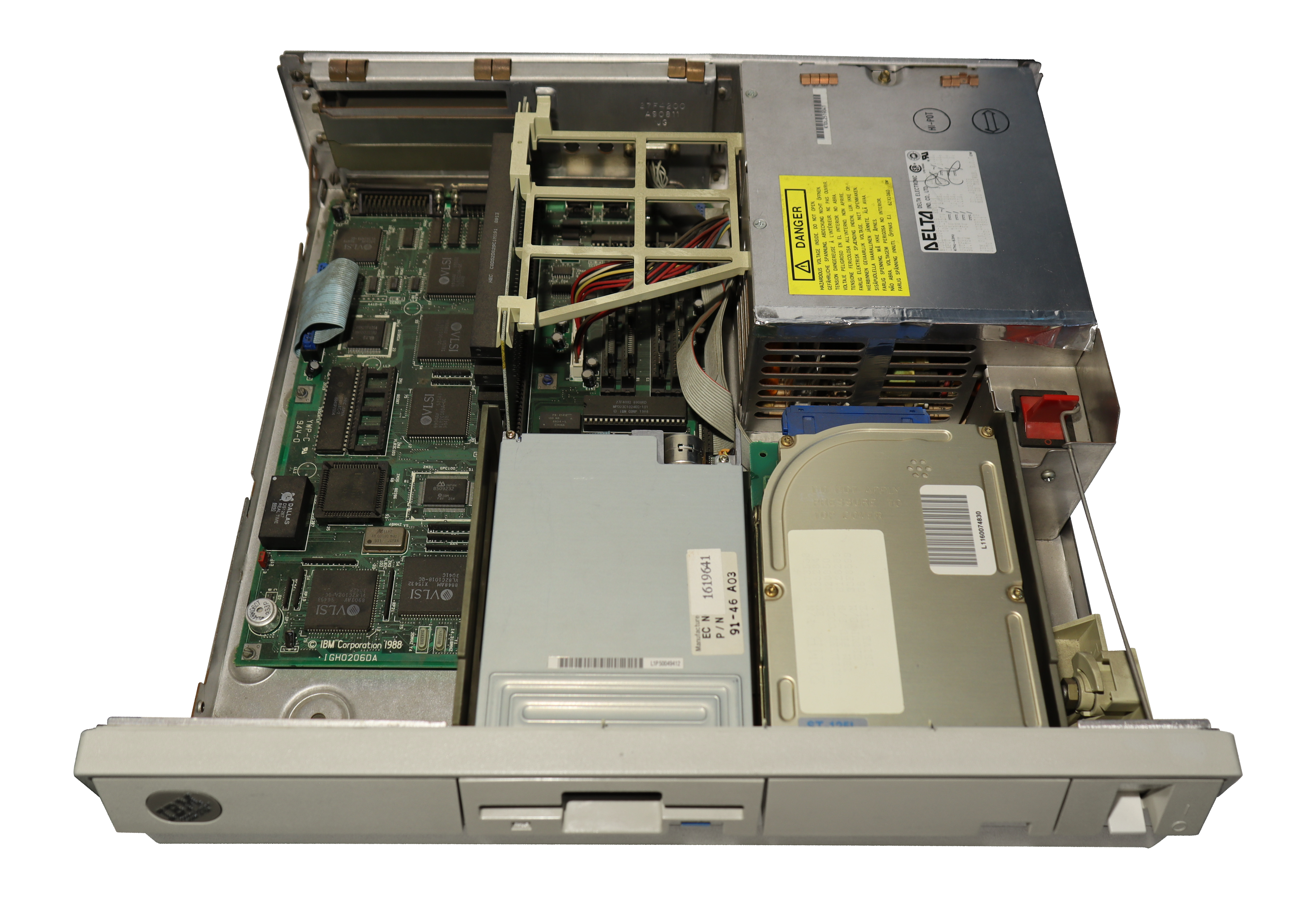
Top view of a Model 30 286 with its case lid opened up

Both the Model 30 and its 286 successor feature the same case design. Their "bleached-beige" chassis measures 16 by 15.5 by 4 inches (41 by 39 by 10 cm)— roughly a third in volume of the PC/AT. The Model 30 weighs 15.7 pounds (7.1 kg). The front and back of the case sport plastic bezels, the front featuring a sloping canopy design off-white in color, while the back is brown. The floppy drive resides in the middle of the front bezel, with the secondary drive bay—either housing a second floppy drive or a hard drive—to the right of the primary floppy drive bay. Should the computer be optioned with a hard drive, its bezel cover has a notch cut in it to show its status indicator. On the far right, next to the second drive bay, is a paddle switch, recessed beneath the front bezel's canopy design to prevent accidental actuation. This front-facing power switch itself is not directly attached to the power supply unit, but is instead linked via a metal rod to the "big red switch" of the power supply unit mounted in the back. A row of slots on the front bezel allow air to passively cool the components inside. A lock and key on the side of the chassis prevents the chassis from being opened up and disables the keyboard. While the higher-end PS/2s feature a modular construction with card-edge connectors for drives and a tool-less approach to user servicing, the Model 30 relies on ribbon cables for these connections and requires the removal of four screws to undo the case lid. The lid itself is made from steel, while the chassis holding the internal components in place is a stamped, U-shaped piece of metal with 0.75-inch folds.

=== Model 30 ===
Two submodels of the Model 30 were available on launch: one with two 3.5-inch 720 KB floppy disk drives and the other with one 3.5-inch disk drive and a 20 MB hard disk drive. Three 8-bit ISA expansion slots are contained in a riser card positioned at the center of and running perpendicular to the system board, with the expansion cards running parallel, in order to save space internally and reduce the computer's physical footprint. The riser card inside the Model 30 was the first of its kind.

The original Model 30 features an Intel 8086 at 8 MHz, with no wait states. It provides 640 KB of random-access memory—128 KB worth of which in chips soldered to the system board, and the remaining 512 KB in the form of removable single in-line packages. The soldered RAM chips are rated for 125-nanosecond operations, while the two banks of SIP RAM have 9-bit chips. Several VLSI gate arrays on the system board consolidate the functions of parallel, serial, PS/2 mouse and keyboard, floppy and hard disk, and on-board graphics. The system board also eliminates jumpers for storing configuration settings; these settings are instead configured via software on a floppy disk provided by IBM and stored in battery-backed SRAM. Seek tests performed on the 3.5-inch floppy drive revealed that it performs at 300 milliseconds, 70 milliseconds slower than the 5.25-inch floppy drive featured in the PC/AT, while the 20 MB hard drive performs at 80 milliseconds—half the speed of the PC/AT's hard drive and marginally better than the PC/XT's.

IBM developed a bespoke display standard for the Model 30, dubbed Multi-Color Graphics Array (MCGA). This display incorporates elements of IBM's more-capable Video Graphics Array (VGA), as introduced in higher-end models of the PS/2 family, into the earlier Color Graphics Adapter standard introduced back in 1981. These include a 2-color 640-by-480-pixel graphics mode, a 256-color 320-by-200-pixel graphics mode (at a so-called "VCR-like resolution"), VGA's 15-pin D-sub connector and analog color signals, and a text mode with an 8-by-16-pixel character size (two pixels taller than EGA's text mode characters).

=== Model 30 286 ===
Internally, the Model 30 286 features an Intel 80286 microprocessor clocked at 10 MHz. Instead of the pin-grid-array version of the 80286 as used in earlier IBM machines, the company opted for the plastic-leaded chip carrier version of the 80286, which was less expensive to produce and is less susceptible to damage when the user removes it from the chip's socket. The optional math co-processor slot meanwhile only supports dual-in-line-packaged 80287s. The packaging of removable RAM was upgraded from 125-ns SIPs to 120-ns SIMMs for the Model 30 286; only 256-kilobit or 1-megabit SIMMs are supported—the latter used in the stock 512 KB of RAM. It is necessary to install identical SIMMs in each of the four sockets available, meaning that RAM upgrades on the motherboard beyond 512 KB are limited to 1 MB, 2 MB, and 4 MB total. The computer supports up to 16 MB of RAM on a third-party external expansion card.

IBM used nine application-specific ICs on the system board both to reduce production cost and make the system board more compact. The more critical of these ASICs are the chipsets defining its AT compatibility, which were developed by VLSI Technology. These ASICs are packaged as surface-mount devices soldered to the board; virtually the only through-hole devices on the board comprise the keyboard controller and two BIOS ROMs, the 80286, and the optional 80287—only because they come in sockets.

The Model 30 286 abandons MCGA for full VGA compatibility. The VGA circuitry is backwards-compatible with EGA, CGA, and MDA (in capability and at the BIOS software level but not fully at the hardware level) and supports up to a resolution of 640 by 480 pixels at 16 colors, as well as 320 by 200 at 256 colors. As the VGA standard interface to the video monitor is fundamentally analog, not digital like the interface to CGA and MDA monitors, VGA (or MCGA) cannot be used with those older monitors. Thus, IBM recommended users purchase their IBM PS/2-styled VGA CRT monitors, available with either monochrome or color picture tubes—neither included in the base price of the Model 30 286. The Model 30 286's VGA circuitry can detect whether a monochrome or color IBM monitor is attached, providing an optimized palette of 64 shades of gray for the monochrome display. The Model 30 286's data path for its VGA circuitry is 8-bits wide, compared to most of the rest of the system's 16-bit wide data paths, and the teletype video routines, as located in its ROM, perform slower than on other members of the PS/2 range with 80386 processors owing to the 286's inability to copy ("shadow") ROM into RAM.

IBM manufactured the Model 30 286's optional 20 MB hard drive, while Alps manufactured its 1.44 MB floppy drives and Delta Electronics manufactured its non-autoranging, slimline 90.75 W power supply unit. The hard drive writes data using the MFM encoding standard; like the one in the original Model 30 before it, journalists remarked it as being slow. It paled in comparison to the AT's, according to PC Magazine, due to IBM limiting its data path to an 8-bit width and reducing the interleave skip factor from three to two. IBM included a disk-caching utility on the included Reference Disk in an attempt to help users offset its slowness.

== Sales ==
Sales of the Model 30 were mediocre in the first few months, according to Dataquest, a market research firm. For example, it was the only entry in the PS/2 lineup not to have a backlog of orders in June 1987. The Model 30 represented only 10 percent of the 250,000 PS/2s sold between the beginning of April and the end of May 1987. Computerworld reported that some outlets were discounting their stock of Model 30s by as much as 20 percent in response to tepid sales. An early enterprise adopter of the Model 30 was Delta Air Lines, who purchased 11,000 units for their customer reservation system. Norman Dewitt of Dataquest speculated that the Model 30 was sold at an artificially high price until remaining inventory of PC/AT and PC/XT were depleted. Despite its relative lackluster performance in the marketplace, the Model 30 sold the best of all PS/2s in the retail space. The Model 30 286 in 1988 was seen as IBM's attempt to target the low-end of single-user systems users, a segment where the PS/2 line had performed poorly as a whole. Winn L. Rosch surmised that it was IBM's loss leader in the personal computer market, "meant to undercut compatibles makers".

By early 1990, the Model 30, along with the Model 50 Z, were the two best-selling models in the PS/2 line. In October 1989 alone, IBM sold 16,000 units of the Model 30.

== Reception ==
Stephen Satchell of InfoWorld rated the original Model 30 as "just fine as a basic corporate computer, network terminal, or for other straightforward uses", calling it "an attractive, low-profile system box that won't take up too much room on your desk". Satchell emphasized its compactness, writing that the system was smaller than some portables and, at 17 pounds, "an easy system to move around when you need to". He clocked its number-crunching performance as slightly faster than the 8086-equipped Deskpro from Compaq and the 6300 Plus from AT&T and on par with an 8-MHz NEC V30–equipped Wang laptop. Satchell found IBM's included documentation skimpy and lacking in information regarding error messages, troubleshooting, and theory of operation—all present in IBM's documentation for its earlier PCs. Satchell and InfoWorld's editors also encountered difficulty with installing expansion cards, finding that the plastic shroud of the riser card provided barely any support, leading to that card slipping out of its slot during expansion card installation and liable to break in two without users supporting the riser from the back with their hands when installing cards. Satchell found serviceability satisfactory, with many IBM dealers privy to the Model 30's service needs in particular, but found IBM's procedure of replacing the real-time clock battery by replacing the entire daughterboard it resides on needless. Satchell concluded that, overall, "this limited machine is an interesting offering for low-end users who want the security of dealing with a true-blue system". (Note: IBM was commonly known as "Big Blue", so by "true-blue", Satchell meant "genuine IBM", not a (mostly) compatible 3rd-party PC clone.)

Gus Venditto of PC Magazine wrote that the Model 30 was "for people who want to get their feet wet in the latest technology but are not ready to take the plunge of buying new boards to outfit their systems". In particular Venditto praised the computer's "rock-solid construction" standard of IBM computers of the time and felt that the MCGA standard afforded users an opportunity "to buy into a piece of IBM's new analog graphics standard [VGA] at the ground floor". Because of the hard drive's slow performance, however, Venditto recommended users eschew the hard-drive-equipped Model 30 in favor of the cheaper dual-floppy model and purchase a faster aftermarket drive at a later date. Venditto later wrote that the Model 30's power supply, which was rated for a little less than half the wattage of the PC/XT, was not as accommodating for power-hungry expansion cards and wrote that the riser card made installing hardcards a potentially risky proposition. He concluded that the Model 30 overall acted as "IBM's link to the new world ... the computer that can help wean the weary away from PC compatibles and get them thinking about the extra power and better graphics available" when ready for the rest of the PS/2 range.

Rosch of PC Magazine called the Model 30 286's case trim and its internals "elegantly spare", with impeccable cable management owing to IBM's use of shorter cables for its floppy and hard drives, which are tucked and folded mostly out of sight. Rosch also appreciated the computer's redesigned PSU power connector, miniaturizing the two cables of the AT motherboard standard but fusing them "so they cannot be inadvertently and disastrously switched". Rosch rebuked some industry commentators' opinions that the Model 30 286 was a rechristened AT or that it represented "IBM's attempt at cloning an IBM clone": "It's no more a clone's clone than the original Model 30. The similarity to other manufacturers' products better shows a marketing convergence. The common design elements ... only mirror technical advances and our own rising expectations". Pitted against the PS/2 Model 50, Rosch proffered that the Model 30 286's significantly lower price was to position non–Micro Channel computers, especially economy AT clones from Blue Chip and Hyundai, as "second-rate cousins". Mitt Jones of the same magazine was more critical, writing that the "low-key atmosphere" of IBM's announcements of the Model 30 286 in Manhattan positioned the computer as "merely a ... workstation in IBM's connectivity-minded plans". He criticized the lack of further expansion ports on the riser, writing: "You can forget about additional serial or parallel ports ... and any memory boards you have lying around from your old AT, not to mention niceties such as fax boards and MIDI interfaces". Jones advised those insisting on the IBM logo and interested in the Model 30 to pay the "few hundred dollars more" for the Model 30 286, but said that for others the Model 30 286 was a "poor choice" because of a slow hard drive and limited expansion.

== Legacy ==
For IBM, the PS/2 line as a whole underperformed in the marketplace and failed to come close to replicating the runaway success of the original IBM PC line. However, the design and layout of components in the Model 30—with the use of a riser card positioned in the center of the motherboard, a slender power supply, and a front-mounted power switch—proved very influential in the personal computer industry and was widely adopted by clone manufacturers over the next decade. The Model 30's design even became the basis of a loosely defined specification of personal computer form factor by Western Digital called Low Profile eXtension (LPX), propagating the Model 30's design even further.

== Submodels ==
IBM PS/2 Model 30 submodels
Model	IBM P/N	Processor	Clock speed (MHz)	Bus	No. of slots	No. of drive bays	FDD	HDD	Stock RAM	Maximum RAM	Video adapter	Monitor	Form factor	Date introduced	Notes	Ref(s).
30	8530-001	Intel 8086	8 (0 w)	ISA, 8-bit	3	2	one 720 KB	none	640 KB	640 KB	MCGA	optional	Desktop	April 1989	Replaces the 8530-002	
30	8530-002	Intel 8086	8 (0 w)	ISA, 8-bit	3	2	two 720 KB	none	640 KB	640 KB	MCGA	optional	Desktop	April 1987		
30	8530-021	Intel 8086	8 (0 w)	ISA, 8-bit	3	2	one 720 KB	20 MB (ST-506)	640 KB	640 KB	MCGA	optional	Desktop	April 1987		
30	8530-R02	Intel 8086	8 (0 w)	ISA, 8-bit	3	2	two 720 KB	none	640 KB	640 KB	MCGA	optional	Desktop	November 1987	Financial workstation	
30	8530-R21	Intel 8086	8 (0 w)	ISA, 8-bit	3	2	one 720 KB	20 MB (ST-506)	640 KB	640 KB	MCGA	optional	Desktop	November 1987	Financial workstation	
30 286	8530-E01	Intel 80286	10 (1 w)	ISA, 16-bit	3	2	one 1.44 MB	none	512 KB	4 MB	VGA	optional	Desktop	September 1988		
30 286	8530-E21	Intel 80286	10 (1 w)	ISA, 16-bit	3	2	one 1.44 MB	20 MB (ST-506)	512 KB	4 MB	VGA	optional	Desktop	September 1988		
30 286	8530-E31	Intel 80286	10 (1 w)	ISA, 16-bit	3	2	one 1.44 MB	30 MB (ESDI)	512 KB	4 MB	VGA	optional	Desktop	September 1989		
30 286	8530-E41	Intel 80286	10 (1 w)	ISA, 16-bit	3	2	one 1.44 MB	40 MB (ESDI)	512 KB	4 MB	VGA	optional	Desktop	April 1991		

== Successor models ==
IBM succeeded the Model 30 and Model 286 with the PS/2 Model 35 and PS/2 Model 40 subfamilies. Like their predecessors, the PS/2 Model 35 and PS/2 Model 40 use the ISA bus and were intended as entry-level models. All four were sold concurrently for some time. Submodels in the Model 35 range (including the flagship PS/2 Model 35 SX, the PS/2 Model 35 LS diskless workstation, and the IBM 386SLC–equipped PS/2 Model 35 SLC) contain three ISA expansion slots and two 3.5-inch drive bays; while submodels in the Model 40 range (including the PS/2 Model 40 SX and the PS/2 Model 40 SLC) feature five ISA expansion slots and four 3.5-inch drive bays.

=== Model 35 ===
IBM PS/2 Model 35 submodels
Model	IBM P/N	Processor	Clock speed (MHz)	Bus	No. of slots	No. of drive bays	FDD	HDD	Stock RAM	Maximum RAM	Video adapter	Monitor	Form factor	Date introduced	Notes	Ref(s).
35 SX	8535-040	Intel 386SX	20 (0–2 w)	ISA, 16-bit	3	2	one 1.44 MB	none	2 MB	4 MB	VGA	optional	Desktop	June 1991		
35 SX	8535-043	Intel 386SX	20 (0–2 w)	ISA, 16-bit	3	2	one 1.44 MB	40 MB (IDE)	2 MB	4 MB	VGA	optional	Desktop	June 1991		
35 SX	8535-045	Intel 386SX	20 (0–2 w)	ISA, 16-bit	3	2	one 1.44 MB	80 MB (IDE)	2 MB	4 MB	VGA	optional	Desktop	Unknown		
35 LS	8535-14X	Intel 386SX	20	ISA, 16-bit	3	2	none	none	2 MB	4 MB	VGA	optional	Desktop	June 1991	Ethernet	
35 LS	8535-24X	Intel 386SX	20	ISA, 16-bit	3	2	none	none	2 MB	4 MB	VGA	optional	Desktop	June 1991	Token Ring	
35 SLC	8535-050	IBM 386SLC	20 (0 w)	ISA, 16-bit	3	2	one 2.88 MB	none	2 MB	16 MB	VGA	optional	Desktop	April 1992		
35 SLC	8535-053	IBM 386SLC	20 (0 w)	ISA, 16-bit	3	2	one 1.44 MB	80 MB (IDE)	2 MB	16 MB	VGA	optional	Desktop	April 1992		
35 SLC	8535-055	IBM 386SLC	20 (0 w)	ISA, 16-bit	3	2	one 2.88 MB	80 MB (IDE)	2 MB	16 MB	VGA	optional	Desktop	April 1992		

=== Model 40 ===
IBM PS/2 Model 40 submodels
Model	IBM P/N	Processor	Clock speed (MHz)	Bus	No. of slots	No. of drive bays	FDD	HDD	Stock RAM	Maximum RAM	Video adapter	Monitor	Form factor	Date introduced	Notes	Ref(s).
40 SX	8540-040	Intel 386SX	20 (0–2 w)	ISA, 16-bit	5	4	one 1.44 MB	none	2 MB	16 MB	VGA	optional	Desktop	June 1991		
40 SX	8540-043	Intel 386SX	20 (0–2 w)	ISA, 16-bit	5	4	one 1.44 MB	40 MB (IDE)	2 MB	16 MB	VGA	optional	Desktop	June 1991		
40 SX	8540-045	Intel 386SX	20 (0–2 w)	ISA, 16-bit	5	4	one 1.44 MB	80 MB (IDE)	2 MB	16 MB	VGA	optional	Desktop	June 1991		
40 SLC	8540-050	IBM 386SLC	20 (0 w)	ISA, 16-bit	5	4	one 1.44 MB	none	2 MB	16 MB	VGA	optional	Desktop	April 1992		
40 SLC	8540-055	IBM 386SLC	20 (0 w)	ISA, 16-bit	5	4	one 1.44 MB	80 MB (IDE)	2 MB	16 MB	VGA	optional	Desktop	April 1992		
