= IBM Personal Computer AT =

Computer released in 1984

IBM PC AT (System Unit 5170)

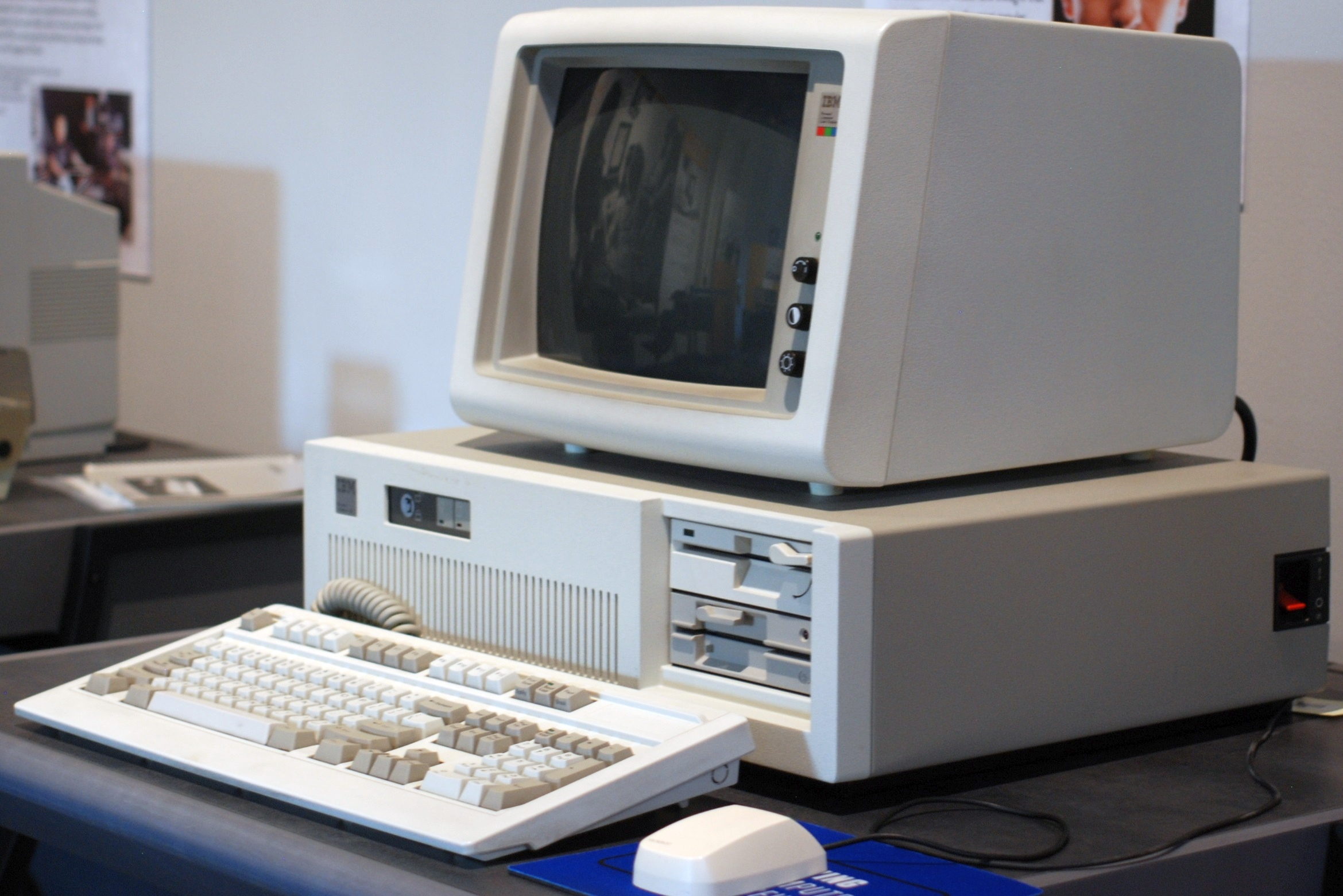
- Also known as: IBM AT, PC/AT
- Manufacturer: IBM
- Type: Personal Computer
- Released: August 14, 1984; 42 years ago
- Lifespan: 1984–1987
- Introductory price: Approx. US$6,000 (equivalent to $19,400 in 2025)
- Discontinued: April 2, 1987
- Units sold: >100,000
- Operating system: IBM PC DOS 3.0+; OS/2 1.x; PC/IX 1.1; IBM & SCO Xenix; Windows 1.0–3.1
- CPU: Intel 80286 @ 6 and 8 MHz
- Memory: 256–512 KB onboard + 3.5 MB with additional memory cards
- Storage: 20 MB hard drive 1.2 MB HD 5.25" (135 mm) floppy drive
- Graphics: CGA, EGA
- Input: Parallel, serial
- Power: 120/240 VAC
- Predecessor: IBM Personal Computer XT
- Successor: IBM Personal System/2
- Related: List of IBM Personal Computer models

The IBM Personal Computer AT (model 5170, abbreviated as IBM AT or PC/AT) was released in August 1984 as the fourth model in the IBM Personal Computer line, following the IBM PC XT and its IBM Portable PC variant. It is based on the 16-bit Intel 80286 microprocessor; the three earlier systems are all Intel 8088-based. The system sold for approximately US$6,000 (equivalent to $19,400 in 2025).

IBM did not specify an expanded form of AT on the machine, press releases, brochures, or documentation, but some sources expand the term as Advanced Technology, including at least one internal IBM document. The IBM PC AT was discontinued in 1987, prior to the release of the IBM PS/2 line.

== History ==
IBM's 1984 introduction of the AT was seen as an unusual move for the company, which typically waited for competitors to release new products before producing its own models. At $4,000–6,000, it was only slightly more expensive than considerably slower IBM models. The announcement surprised rival executives, who admitted that matching IBM's prices would be difficult. No major competitor showed a comparable computer at COMDEX Las Vegas that year.

In April 1986 IBM revised the AT, increasing the speed of its Intel 80286 CPU from 6 to 8 MHz.

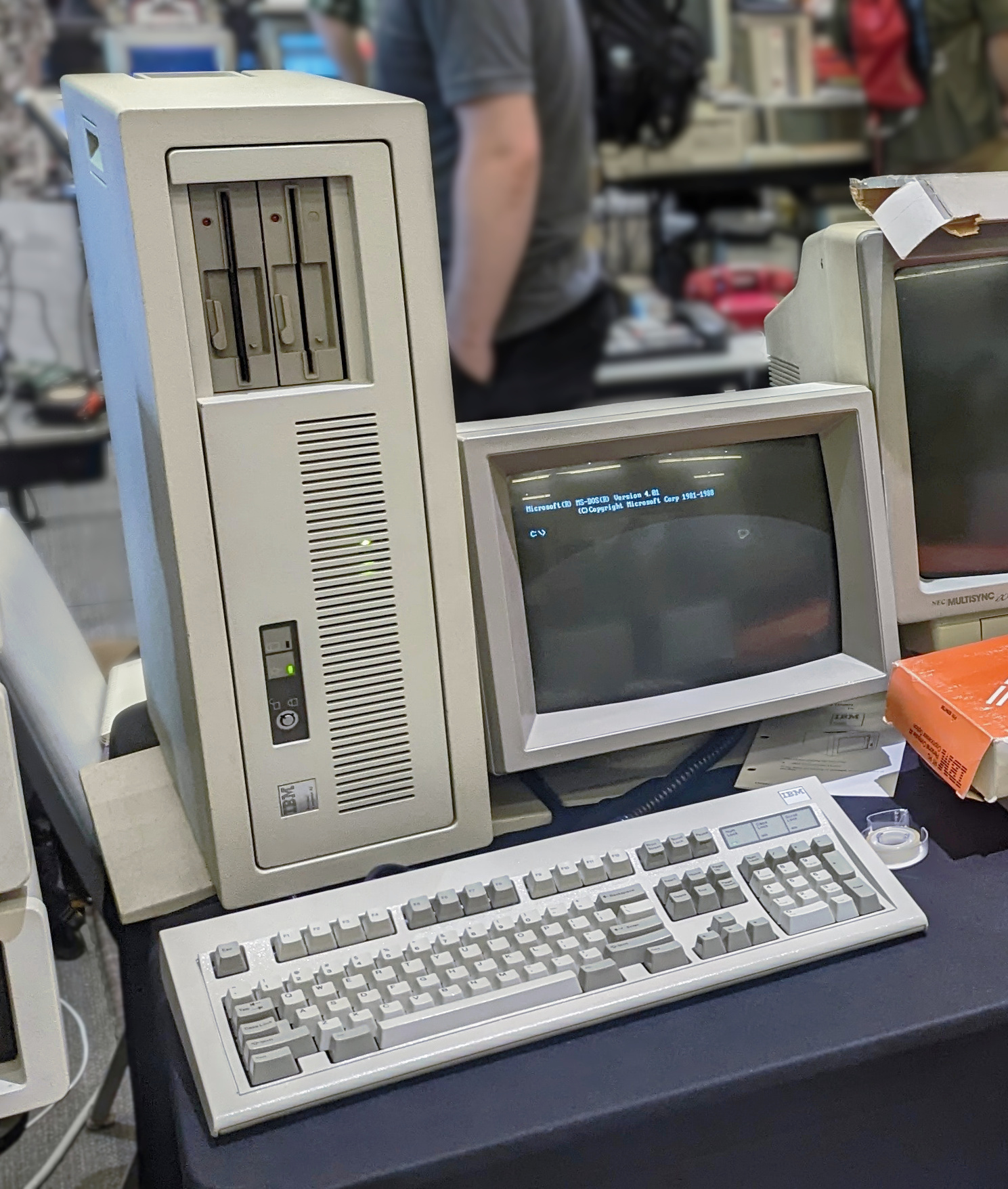
IBM 5170 with Floor Standing Enclosure and compatible non-IBM display

== Features ==
The AT is IBM PC compatible, with the most significant difference being a move to the 80286 processor from the 8088 processor of prior models. Like the IBM PC, the AT supported an optional math co-processor chip, the Intel 80287, for faster execution of floating point operations.

In addition, it introduced the AT bus, later known as the ISA bus, a 16-bit bus with backward compatibility with 8-bit PC-compatible expansion cards. The bus also offered fifteen IRQs and seven DMA channels, expanded from eight IRQs and four DMA channels for the PC, achieved by adding another 8259A IRQ controller and another 8237A DMA controller. Some IRQ and DMA channels are used by the motherboard and not exposed on the expansion bus. Both dual IRQ and DMA chipsets are cascading which shares the primary pair. In addition to these chipsets, Intel 82284 Clock Driver and Ready Interface and Intel 82288 Bus Controller are to support the microprocessor.

The 24-bit address bus of the 286 expands RAM capacity to 16 MB.

PC DOS 3.0 was included with support for the new AT features, including preliminary kernel support for networking (which was fully supported in a later version 3.x release).

The motherboard includes a battery-backed real-time clock (RTC) using the Motorola MC146818. This was an improvement from the PC, which required setting the clock manually or installing an RTC expansion card. The RTC also included a 1024 Hz timer (on IRQ 8), a much finer resolution than the 18 Hz timer on the PC.

In addition to keeping the time, the RTC includes 50 bytes of CMOS memory which is used to store software-adjustable BIOS parameters. A disk-based BIOS setup program which saved to this memory took the place of the DIP switches used to set system settings on PCs. Most AT clones have the setup program in ROM rather than on disk.

=== Storage ===
The standard floppy drive was upgraded to a 1.2 MB 5 1/4 inch floppy disk drive (15 sectors of 512 bytes, 80 tracks, two sides), which stored over three times as much data as the 360 KB PC floppy disk, but had compatibility problems with 360k disks (see Problems below). 3 1/2 inch floppy drives became available in later ATs.

A 20 MB hard disk drive was included as standard. Early drives were manufactured by Computer Memories and were found to be very unreliable.

=== Peripherals ===
The AT at first shipped with the AT keyboard, initially a new 84-key layout (the 84th key being SysRq). The numerical keypad was now clearly separated from the main key group, and indicator LEDs were added for Caps Lock, Scroll Lock and Num Lock. The AT keyboard uses the same 5-pin DIN connector as the PC keyboard, but a different, bidirectional electrical interface with different keyboard scan codes. The bidirectional interface allows the computer to set the LED indicators on the keyboard, reset the keyboard, set the typematic rate, and other features.

From April 1986, ATs shipped with the Model M keyboard.

The AT is also equipped with a physical lock that prevents access to the computer by disabling the keyboard and holding the system unit's cover in place.

ATs could be equipped with CGA, MDA, EGA, or PGA video cards.

The 8250 UART from the PC was upgraded to the 16450, but since both chips had single-byte buffers, high-speed serial communication was problematic as with the XT.

=== Models ===
IBM Personal Computer AT models
Type	IBM P/N	Date announced	Date withdrawn	Bus	No. of slots	No. of bays	Processor	Clock speed (MHz)	Stock onboard RAM (KB)	Maximum onboard RAM (KB)	FDD	HDD	Notes	Ref(s).
AT	5170–068	August 1984	June 1987	ISA, 16-bit	8	3	Intel 80286	6	256 KB	512 KB	1.2 MB	none		
AT	5170–099	August 1984	June 1987	ISA, 16-bit	8	3	Intel 80286	6	512 KB	512 KB	1.2 MB	20 MB		
AT	5170–239	October 1985	September 1986	ISA, 16-bit	8	3	Intel 80286	6	512 KB	512 KB	1.2 MB	30 MB		
AT	5170–839	January 1986	June 1987	ISA, 16-bit	8	3	Intel 80286	6	512 KB	512 KB	1.2 MB	two 30 MB	Includes controllers for the IBM 4680 Store System	
AT	5170–899	January 1986	June 1987	ISA, 16-bit	8	3	Intel 80286	6	512 KB	512 KB	1.2 MB	two 20 MB	Includes controllers for the IBM 4680 Store System	
AT	5170–319	April 1986	June 1987	ISA, 16-bit	8	3	Intel 80286	8	512 KB	512 KB	1.2 MB	30 MB		
AT	5170–339	April 1986	July 1987	ISA, 16-bit	8	3	Intel 80286	8	512 KB	512 KB	1.2 MB	30 MB	Shipped with Enhanced Keyboard	
AT	5171–168	October 1986	June 1987	ISA, 16-bit	8	3	Intel 80286	8	512 KB	512 KB	1.2 MB	none	Built to TEMPEST specifications	
AT	5171–339	October 1986	July 1987	ISA, 16-bit	8	3	Intel 80286	8	512 KB	512 KB	1.2 MB	30 MB	Built to TEMPEST specifications	
AT/370	5170–599	October 1984	April 1987	ISA, 16-bit	8	3	Intel 80286	6	512 KB	512 KB	1.2 MB	20 MB		
AT/370	5170–739	October 1985	April 1987	ISA, 16-bit	8	3	Intel 80286	6	512 KB	512 KB	1.2 MB	30 MB		
AT/370	5170–919	April 1986	April 1987	ISA, 16-bit	8	3	Intel 80286	6	512 KB	512 KB	1.2 MB	30 MB	1 MB total RAM (peripheral)	
AT/370	5170–939	April 1986	April 1987	ISA, 16-bit	8	3	Intel 80286	6	512 KB	512 KB	1.2 MB	30 MB	1 MB total RAM (peripheral); shipped with Enhanced Keyboard	

=== Power supply ===
The IBM PC AT came with a 192-watt switching power supply, significantly higher than the 130-watt XT power supply.

According to IBM's documentation, in order to function properly, the AT power supply needed a load of at least 7.0 amperes on the +5 V line and a minimum of 2.5 amperes on its +12 V line. The power supply would fail to start unless these minimum load requirements were met, but the AT motherboard did not provide much load on the +12 V line. To solve this problem, entry-level IBM AT models that did not have a hard drive were shipped with a 5-ohm, 50-watt resistor connected on the +12 V line of the hard disk power connector. In normal operation this resistor drew 2.4 amperes (dissipating 28.8 watts), getting fairly hot.

== Problems ==
In addition to the unreliable hard disk drive, the high-density floppy disk drives turned out to be problematic. Some ATs came with one high-density (HD) disk drive and one double-density (DD) 360 KB drive. High-density floppy diskette media were compatible only with high-density drives.

There was no way for the disk drive to detect what kind of floppy disk was inserted, and the drives were not distinguished except by an asterisk molded into the 360 KB disk drive faceplate. If the user accidentally used a high-density diskette in the 360 KB drive, it would sometimes work, for a while, but the high-coercivity oxide would take a very weak magnetization from the 360 KB write heads, so reading the diskette would be problematic.

Conversely, the high-density drive's heads had a track width half that of the 360 KB drive, so they were incapable of fully erasing and overwriting tracks written by a 360 KB drive. Overwriting a DD disk that had been written in a DD drive with an HD drive would result in a disk that read on an HD drive, but produced read errors in a DD drive. Whereas a HD read head would only pick up the half track that drive had written, the wider DD read head would pick up the half-track written by the HD drive mixed with the unerased half-track remnant of the track written earlier by a DD drive. Thus, the DD drive would end up reading both new and old information together, causing it to see garbled data.

== Clones ==
The PC AT architecture was functionally an open design, and IBM's efforts to trademark the AT name largely failed. Many 286-based PCs were modeled after it and marketed as AT-compatible. The label also became a standard term in reference to PCs that used the same type of power supply, case, and motherboard layout as the 5170. AT-class became a term describing any machine which supported the same BIOS functions, 80286 or greater processor, 16-bit expansion slots, keyboard interface, 1.2 MB 5 1/4 inch floppy disk drives and other defining technical features of the IBM PC AT.

Large companies that had been late to release PC compatibles rushed out AT compatibles, with an estimated 100,000 sold by the end of 1985. In the United States, popular brands of AT clones included the Tandy 3000, Compaq Deskpro 286, HP Vectra, Zenith Z-286, Epson Equity Models II+ and III, and Commodore PC-30 and PC-40. In Europe, on the other hand, most AT-clones sold were more or less anonymous.

The AT bus became the de facto ISA (Industry Standard Architecture), while PC XT slots were retroactively named 8-bit ISA. The disk interface for the AT, originally a Seagate ST506 compatible interface on IBM's disk controller card, was updated and standardized as ATA ("AT Attachment") by Western Digital and Compaq in 1986, and later renamed PATA (Parallel AT Attachment). The ATA interface was also known as IDE, because the drive controller, instead of being on the interface card, was integrated into the drive (Integrated Drive Electronics).

== Reception ==
By January 1985, AT sales were so strong that IBM and its suppliers could not keep up with demand. An estimated 350,000 were sold by the end of 1985.

Creative Computing in December 1984 said "the folks at IBM have done it again". It approved of the "refreshingly standard" keyboard layout, but said that "for most individuals, AT power represents overkill ... a state of the art machine at a top of the line price". That month the magazine's David H. Ahl chose the AT as the best desktop computer when "price is no object" for 1984, describing it as "an innovative, state-of-the-art computer that has the competition gasping for breath". An industry analyst wrote in Computerworld in 1985 that the AT's power was evidence of IBM's belief that personal computers were more important for the company than minicomputers.

== Successor ==
On April 2, 1987, IBM announced the Personal System/2 (PS/2) line, which they marketed as the second-generation of IBM PC. The company promised to continue manufacturing certain models of the first-generation PC, including the AT, for the coming months. In June 1987, they announced the full withdrawal of the PC/XT and the imminent discontinuation of the PC/AT. The last units of PC/AT (model 339) rolled off the assembly line in July. While the PC/XT received a directly compatible replacement in the form of the PS/2 Model 30, the AT did not. Users either had to forgo all their 16-bit ISA expansion cards and switch to the proprietary Micro Channel architecture, or settle for a clone if they wanted to upgrade their machine while keeping their expansions. Eventually, in September 1988, IBM announced the PS/2 Model 30 286, which featured an Intel 80286 processor and 16-bit ISA expansion slots, serving as the direct replacement for the AT for customers who wanted to buy a true IBM system.

== Timeline ==
Timeline of the IBM Personal Computer

Asterisk (*) denotes a model released in Japan only

== See also ==
- AT (form factor)
- Industry Standard Architecture
- IBM PS/2
