= Maclocks =

Computer security lock products

- Company type: Private company
- Industry: Mobile computing accessories
- Founded: 1986; 39 years ago
- Founder: Alexander Gad
- Headquarters: Conyers, Georgia, United States
- Area served: Worldwide
- Owner: Compulocks Brands Inc.
- Website: www.maclocks.com

Maclocks are a line of computer security lock and display products that focuses on security for Apple products. The brand was first released in 1986 and is manufactured by Compulocks.

== History ==
The Maclocks product line was introduced by Compulocks in 1986.

In 2011, Maclocks announced a security sleeve lock for the MacBook Air. Maclocks released the first locking system for the MacBook Pro with Retina Display in 2012. In 2013, Maclocks introduced iMac locks that protect RAM panels. In 2015, Maclocks security systems for tablets and display kiosks were added to Tech Data's commercial portfolio in the Spanish market.Maclocks also released a universal anti-theft lock for the MacBook Pro in 2018.

== Products ==
One product Maclocks is known for is the Blade, a universal lock that can be used on any device without the need for slots.

Another product Maclocks is known for is the Ledge, a lock slot adapter that is compatible with most Macbooks.

Maclocks also produced secure cases or sleeves that encase physically protect laptops that do not have slots for standard locks and security cable locks that attach to computers' power supply connectors.

In addition to products for Mac laptops, the Maclocks brand also releases security products such as cable locks and cases for iPads. Maclocks has also released security products that protect computers' RAM panels and security stands for displaying computers or tablets at retail kiosks.
