= NLX (form factor) =

NLX (short for New Low Profile eXtended) was a form factor proposed by Intel and developed jointly with IBM, DEC, and other vendors for low profile, low cost, mass-marketed retail PCs. Release 1.2 was finalized in March 1997 and release 1.8 was finalized in April 1999. NLX was similar in overall design to LPX, including a riser card and a low-profile slimline case. It was modernized and updated to allow support for the latest technologies while keeping costs down and fixing the main problems with LPX. It specified motherboards from 10 × 8 in (254 × 203 mm) to 13.6 × 9 in (345 × 229 mm) in size.

Officially, the NLX form factor was designed to use ATX power supplies and featured the same soft power function. However, for size reduction, some NLX cases instead used the smaller SFX form factor or proprietary form factors with the same 20-pin connector.

Many slimline systems that were formerly designed to fit the LPX form factor were modified to fit NLX. NLX is a true standard, unlike LPX, making interchangeability of components easier than it was for the older form factor. IBM, Gateway, and NEC produced a fair number of NLX computers in the late 1990s, primarily for Socket 370 (Pentium II-III and Celeron), but NLX never enjoyed the widespread acceptance that LPX had. Most importantly, one of the largest PC manufacturers, Dell decided against using NLX and created their own proprietary motherboards for use in their slimline systems. Although many of these computers and motherboards are still available secondhand, new production has essentially ceased, and in the slimline and small form factor market, NLX has been superseded by the Micro-ATX, FlexATX, and Mini-ITX form factors.
