= Blue Chip Electronics =

Former American computer company

Blue Chip Electronics, Inc.
- Type: Private
- Industry: Computer
- Founded: 1981; 45 years ago in Dallas, Texas, United States
- Founder: John Rossi
- Defunct: 1989; 37 years ago
- Fate: Acquired by Capewood Limited; trademark abandoned in 1995
- Headquarters: Scottsdale, Arizona (1982–1986); Tempe, Arizona (1986); Chandler, Arizona (1986–1989)
- Products: BCD/5.25; Blue Chip PC
- Number of employees: 30 (1989, peak)

Blue Chip Electronics, Inc., later Blue Chip International, was an American computer company active from 1981 to 1989. It was founded by John Rossi, a veteran of Commodore Business Machines, and headquartered in Arizona for most of its existence. The company first gained recognition as a manufacturer of peripherals for the Commodore 64. Blue Chip's early product line included dot matrix printers and the BCD/5.25 floppy disk drive, the latter of which was designed to compete directly with Commodore's own 1541 floppy drive by offering faster performance and a smaller footprint.

The company is best known for its entry into the IBM PC compatible market with the Blue Chip PC in 1986. To produce the machine, Rossi established an exclusive partnership with Hyundai, marking the second instance of a Korean chaebol mass-producing personal computers for the American market. Marketed as a low-cost alternative to other IBM PC clones, the Blue Chip PC was sold through major department stores rather than dedicated computer retailers and was one of the first PCs aimed squarely at home office users.

Despite its initial success in the PC clone market, Blue Chip Electronics faced difficulty toward the end of the 1980s. Following a period of international expansion, the partnership with Hyundai abruptly collapsed, leading Hyundai to establish its own direct presence in the United States while Blue Chip turned to TriGem Computer, another Korean manufacturer. Blue Chip was ultimately acquired by Capewood Limited of Hong Kong in 1989, and its namesake trademark was abandoned by the mid-1990s.

== 1982–1986: Foundation and Commodore peripherals ==
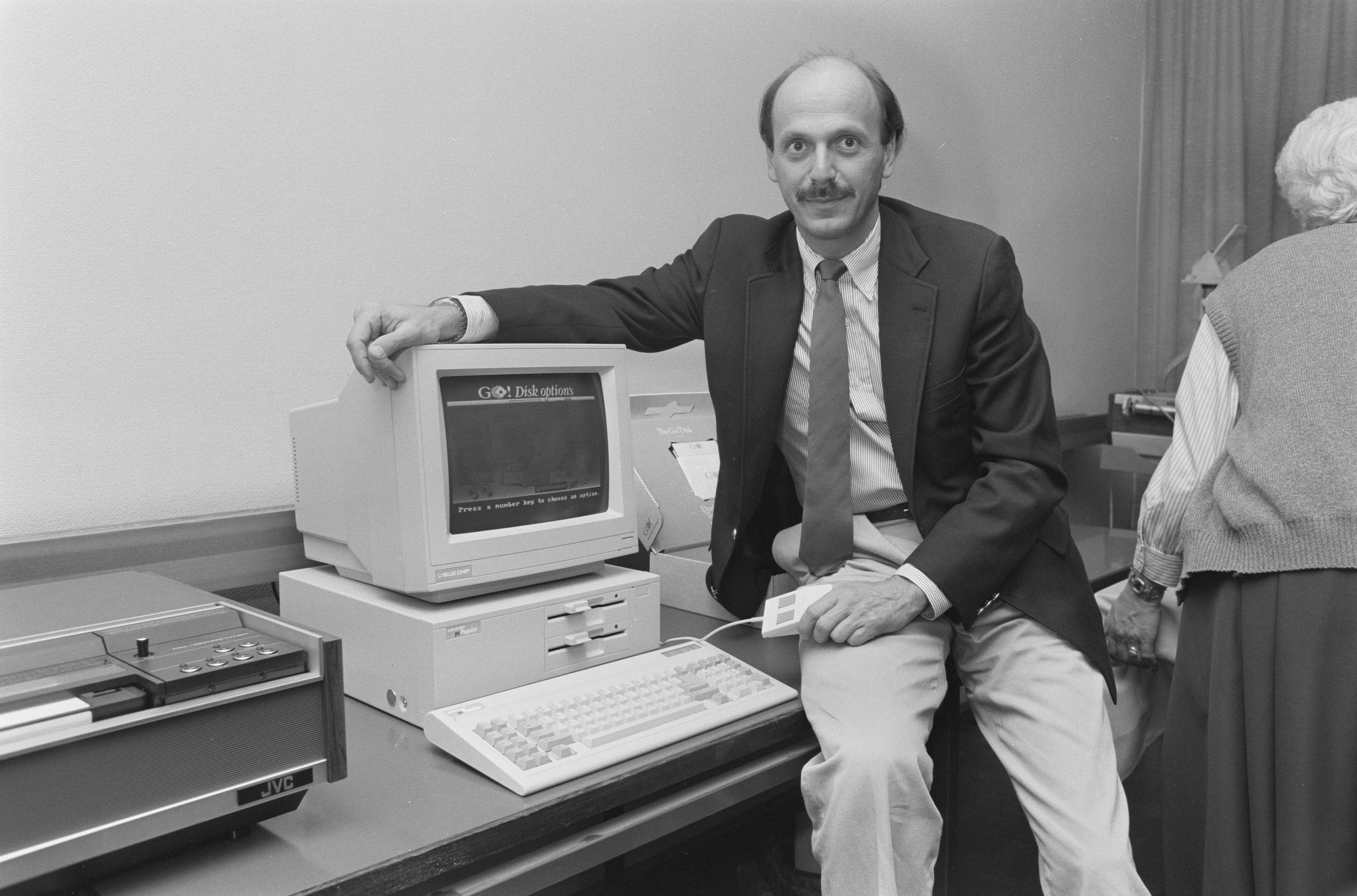
John Rossi, founder of Blue Chip Electronics, presenting his Blue Chip PC Popular in 1987

Blue Chip Electronics was founded by John Rossi, an Arizona native who graduated from Arizona State University in the early 1970s. While in university, he married his high school sweetheart Rosita Rossi. After graduation, both Rosita and John Rossi spent three years in Saudi Arabia, the former landing a job teaching English to residents of villages near a gas–oil separation plant during the 1973 oil crisis. Taking an interest in international business during his stay in Saudi Arabia, John Rossi moved back to the United States in the mid-1970s for a Bachelor of Global Management at Thunderbird School of Global Management. He graduated in 1980, and by the end of the year he had launched his career in technology working for GTE Microcircuits. John Rossi turned over to Commodore Business Machines shortly after that, moving to Europe and earning the title of sales manager for Commodore's market in that continent.

Rosita Rossi expressed exasperation with the long hours John had been working: "The company was going through great growth, and they didn't care about the families—just their business." John Rossi himself was dissatisfied with Commodore's management during the mid-1980s, when the company underwent three changes of chief executive officer (CEO), which removed its founder Jack Tramiel from office. In 1986, Rossi referred to Commodore as a "well-known revolving door". The two had considered moving to Germany, Scotland, and Hong Kong before settling in Dallas, Texas, in the United States. There, John Rossi incorporated Blue Chip Electronics as a side business in 1981. By 1982, the company relocated to and formally incorporated itself in Scottsdale, Arizona, after Rosita began attending Thunderbird to earn a business degree for herself. John hired another employee to help him devise the company's first products, while Rosita completed school. Although she had planned to work elsewhere, she became Blue Chip's third employee after graduating from Thunderbird in 1983.

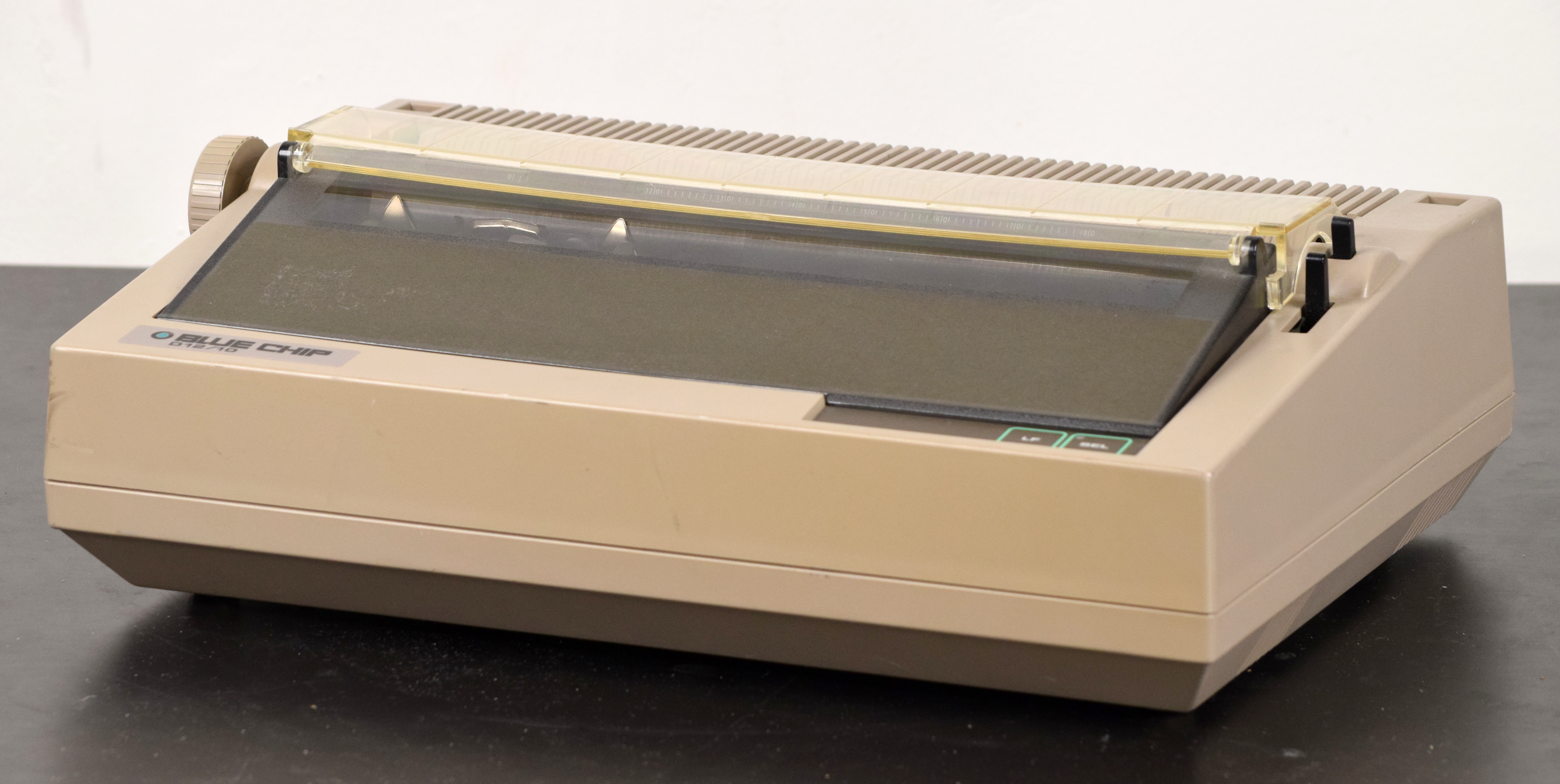
A D12-D10 daisy wheel printer

Blue Chip offered its first products in 1983 with a line of RS-232 serial and HP-IB parallel high-resolution dot-matrix printers for computers such as the Commodore 64 and the IBM PC. Later that year Blue Chip introduced a daisy wheel printer, the BCD-4015, that supports both cut-sheet and tractor-feed stationery, 5 to 15 inches wide. In 1984 the company released a lower-resolution dot-matrix printer, the M120/10, compatible only with the C64, in direct competition with Commodore's own dot-matrix printers.

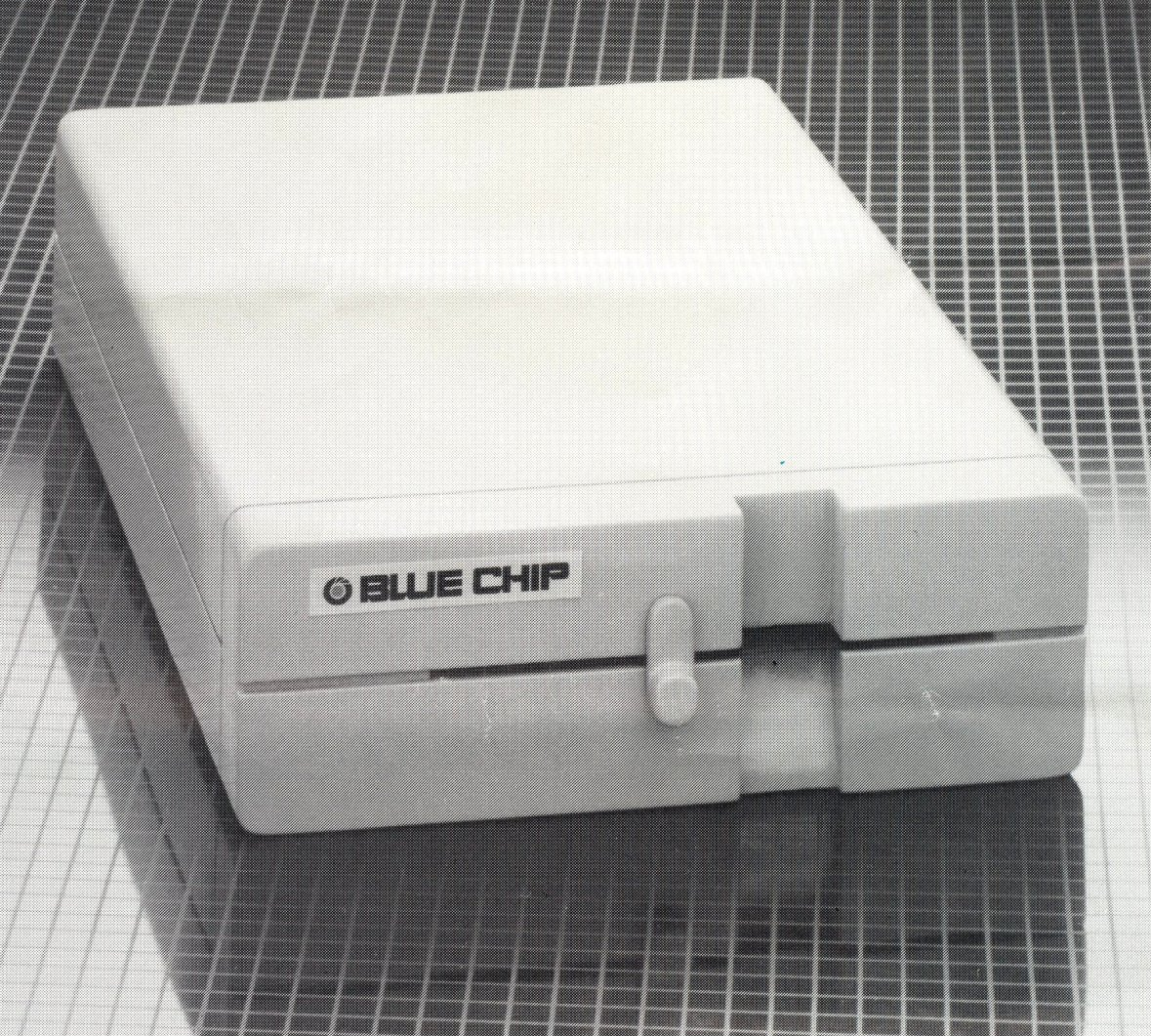
A BCD/5.25 with a disk inside

By early 1986, the company had moved to Tempe. In late 1985, Blue Chip released the BCD/5.25, a direct-drive 5.25-inch floppy disk drive, directly competing against the Commodore 1541 floppy drive for the C64. The BCD/5.25 is faster than the 1541 and has a smaller footprint. When paired with the Commodore 128, the BCD/5.25 can be used in that computer's C64 compatibility mode while retaining its increase in speed, whereas Commodore's 1571 drive cannot take advantage of its own "burst" mode within the C128's C64 mode, instead emulating the earlier 1541 with its slower throughput.

By mid-1986, Blue Chip had moved again, to Chandler. It was now valued at US$60 million. In the same year the company planned to release the BCD/128, a competitor to the 1571, with its own burst mode, and the BCD/3.5, which would allow 3.5-inch floppy disks to be used with the C64. The BCD/3.5 was to be compatible with the 128 but without burst mode. Only the BCD/128 was released.

== 1986–1987: Partnership with Hyundai ==
In July 1986, the company announced an IBM PC compatible, the Blue Chip Personal Computer, to be released in October. Although some mail order companies were offering lower-priced systems, Blue Chip's clone was expected to be the lowest-priced system sold through retail channels. Blue Chip hired an unnamed company in Japan to design the computer and Hyundai Electronics in South Korea to manufacture it. The Blue Chip PC became the second Korean-made personal computer system marketed in the United States, after Leading Edge's Model D in 1985, built by Daewoo. Hyundai Electronics had been founded earlier in 1983 to market the parent company's computer hardware directly to resellers abroad. Other chaebols at the time relied on the white-label market, signing contracts with companies abroad to be their original equipment manufacturer (OEM), in exchange for their products being rebranded and rebadged. Hyundai's first attempt at selling hardware under their name in the West had been largely unsuccessful; its competitors Daewoo and Samsung, on the other hand, had become well-entrenched in the American computer market from their white-label partnerships with U.S.-based resellers.

Although Hyundai's higher-ups continued to push for the Hyundai name to become a household name for computer hardware the United States, the company decided to relent by finding a suitable American reseller for their computer systems. In the mid-1980s, Blue Chip was seeking a manufacturer for its Commodore-compatible printers. When Rossi chose Hyundai as a candidate, Hyundai hinted at plans to develop its own IBM PC clone. Upon hearing this, Rossi convinced Hyundai executives to sell the computer under the Blue Chip name. In February 1986, Rossi met with Hyundai's Sung-hee Lee to formally sign the contract between the two companies. Under their contract, Blue Chip was the exclusive seller of computers manufactured by Hyundai.

The Blue Chip PC has an Intel 8088 microprocessor running at 4.77 MHz, 512 KB of RAM (supporting up to 640 KB), six expansion slots, one 5.25-inch floppy drive, a high-resolution Hercules-compatible monochrome graphics card, and serial and parallel ports built into the motherboard. The base configuration originally retailed for US$699, the cheapest PC clone sold through department stores at the time, according to the Los Angeles Times. A green- or amber-phosphor monochrome monitor was sold separately for US$89. The Blue Chip PC was intended to be bundled with MS-DOS 3.2 as part of its base configuration. However, on launch, this was sold separately, along with GW-BASIC, for US$100.

Blue Chip contracted the manufacturing of 120,000 units of the computer to Hyundai in July and had several department stores on board to sell all units, including Target and Caldor. In the next month, the company chose these two stores as test markets for the computer. Rossi expected interest from the educational sector to exceed that from retail customers. However, 80 percent of purchases during this test run came from small businesses based in home offices, who sought a computer at around US$700 that they could buy from stores. Following this realization, Rossi began focusing Blue Chip's marketing exclusively on the home office segment, becoming one of the first PC vendors to do so. Blue Chip nearly doubled the number of units for Hyundai to manufacture, with Rossi expecting to sell up to 200,000 units by the next year, while Hyundai expected up to a quarter of a million units sold.

On its launch in October, the Blue Chip PC was stocked in over 500 department stores across the continental United States, including Target, Caldor, Sears, Venture, Federated Group, and Fedco, as well as select Walmart, Save Mart, and Toys "R" Us stores. Blue Chip supported the launch with a radio advertising campaign devised by WFC Advertising of Phoenix, Arizona. Meanwhile, Hyundai Motor Company was becoming established in the United States with its low-cost cars during the mid-1980s, and Rossi expressed interest in tying future versions of the computer with the Hyundai name.

From September to November, 27,000 units of the Blue Chip PC were sold. Although disappointed that this was only roughly a quarter of their expected sales, they remained optimistic and projected a total of 50,000 units sold by the end of 1986. While they expressed doubt that this would turn much of a profit, they anticipated higher returns from successors of the Blue Chip PC being sold at higher prices. Meanwhile, Blue Chip was concerned about its lack of a repair service network and skilled sales force. The company sought to rectify the latter by educating retail salespeople through seminars, training videos, and a floppy disk that demonstrated the computer's strengths. The company also hired Bryan Kerr, previously the director of marketing for the Tramiel-led Atari Corporation, as vice-president of marketing and sales in late November.

By November 1986, Blue Chip had 20 employees at its Chandler office, all of which were executives in specialist positions. That month the company introduced the Blue Chip PC AT, an AT-compatible with an Intel 80286 running at a user-switchable 8- or 10-MHz clock speed, 1 MB of RAM (expandable to 16 MB), a single 1.2 MB 5.25-inch floppy drive, an optional 40- or 80-MB hard disk drive, integrated EGA graphics, a 12-inch monochrome monitor, and keyboard. Its base configuration retailed for US$1895.

In February 1987, Hyundai bought an undisclosed minority portion of interest in Blue Chip. In spite of market apathy early in the year even after steep price cuts to the Blue Chip PC and AT, Blue Chip and Hyundai pressed forward in May 1987 to develop the Blue Chip PC Popular, also based on the IBM PC but with a lower initial retail price of US$549. Blue Chip included with the PC Popular a keyboard, mouse, and other value-adds but still sold the monitor separately. A month later the company announced the PC Turbo, featuring similar specifications to its first computer including six expansion slots, but now with an 8088 processor with a clock speed switchable between 4.77 MHz and 8 MHz and a 30 MB hard drive. In mid-1987, Blue Chip introduced their original blue Chip PC in the United Kingdom to compete with Amstrad and their low-cost PCW series.

== 1987–1990: Breakup with Hyundai and acquisition ==
Roughly 50,000 Hyundai-built Blue Chip computers were delivered to customers by fall 1987. The company's sales were so strong that the editors of the British computer magazine Personal Computer World declared Blue Chip "America's most successful clone manufacturer" in June 1987. That month, Blue Chip abruptly terminated its relationship with Hyundai. Blue Chip alleged that Hyundai let an order of 9,000 original PC Turbos and 21,400 PC Populars lapse and that Hyundai was selling the computers to other dealers. Blue Chip followed up with a lawsuit, seeking US$4.5 million in damages, and turned to TriGem Computer, another Korean electronics company, for manufacturing. After breaking away from Blue Chip, Hyundai began selling computers under its own name in the United States, starting in September 1987.

In November that year, Blue Chip and TriGem released the Master PC 286, increasing the clock speed of the Blue Chip AT to 10–12 MHz switchable and with eight expansion slots. This was followed up in fall 1987 with the Master PC 386, featuring an Intel 80386, as well as versions of each in the form of luggable computers. During the same period, the company introduced fax modems and a standalone "paper-white" CRT monitor.

The company established a subsidiary for international business, Blue Chip International, in 1988. By 1989, the company had grown to 30 employees, including John and Rosita Rossi, and its international subsidiary had offices in Hong Kong, Paris, and Amsterdam. Rossi blamed Blue Chip's business difficulties on dealings with thematically inappropriate retailers such as Service Merchandise and camera stores, and sought to add computer configurations available only to specialist retailers. The company released the Blue Chip 286 and Blue Chip 386, each of which features a 1.2 MB 5.25 floppy drive and a 40 MB hard drive. The 386 was their most expensive product to date, at US$3,199 in its base configuration, while the base configuration for the 286 was US$1,299. The 386 features an 80386 processor and 1 MB of base memory, expandable to 16 MB, while the latter features an 80286 and 512 KB of RAM (expandable up to 1 MB). Blue Chip also released a compact laser printer, for US$2,499.

In January 1989, Capewood Limited, a holding company based in Hong Kong, expressed interest in acquiring Blue Chip Electronics and its International subsidiary for an undisclosed sum. Rossi stated that Capewood intended to continue to market Blue Chip's products while expanding its product lines into the 1990s. The deal was completed in November 1989, with Capewood acquiring 100 percent of the company. Rossi did not join the new board of directors, having pursued "other interests". The company was by this point down to 20 employees.

Capewood apparently struggled with the Blue Chip name in 1990, with allegations of the company delivering faulty machines and generating bad debt among dealers. At least one dealer, Crown Computers, took legal action against Blue Chip that year. Blue Chip disappeared from the market in 1992, and the Blue Chip trademark was declared abandoned in 1995. According to author Richard M. Steers, the company's computers "came and went before most customers even noticed them".

== See also ==
- Delta Computer
- Indus GT
- MSD Super Disk
