= Delta Computer =

Defunct American computer company

Delta Computer Corporation
- Company type: Private
- Industry: Computer
- Founded: October 1986; 39 years ago in Canton, Massachusetts, United States
- Founder: Eugene "Gene" F. Taylor
- Defunct: 1990; 36 years ago
- Fate: Bankruptcy liquidation
- Headquarters: El Segundo, California (1989–1990)
- Parent: Inspectorate International Group

Delta Computer Corporation was a short-lived American computer systems company active from 1986 to 1990 and originally based in Canton, Massachusetts. The company marketed a variety of IBM PC compatible systems featuring Intel's 8088, 80286, and i386 processors under the Deltagold name. Delta also marketed a variety of peripherals, namely modems. The company was well known for the styling of their products, bucking from the ubiquitous beige color of the vast majority of computer cases available on the market at the time by offering their computers in two-tone charcoal black, with gold trim. After a widely publicized failed move of their headquarters to Akron, Ohio, Delta filed for bankruptcy in 1990 and soon after disappeared from the market.

== History ==
=== Foundation (1986–1987) ===
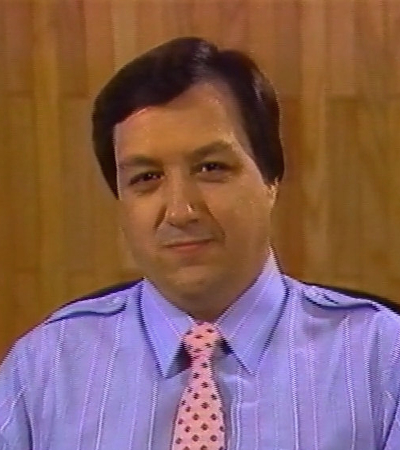
Founder Gene F. Taylor, circa 1988

Delta Computer was founded by Eugene "Gene" F. Taylor in Canton, Massachusetts, in October 1986. Before founding Delta, Taylor was previously the vice president of sales for the Korean company Samsung Electronics' American subsidiary from 1984 to September 1986 and was responsible for the latter's marketing in the United States. Taylor recruited a number of key employees from Leading Edge Products, their nearest rival also based in Canton, during Delta's foundation. The company planned to market computers manufactured by Samsung, mirroring Leading Edge's strategy with their relationship with the Korean conglomerate Daewoo forged in the mid-1980s. The company was made a business unit of Inspectorate International Group, an investment firm based in Birmingham, England. Taylor's poaching of Leading Edge employees prompted a lawsuit against Delta by the latter in February 1987, Leading Edge accusing Delta of stealing trade secrets, among other damages.

Delta's first products were announced in May 1987 and comprised a duo of IBM PC compatibles manufactured by Samsung. The computers were christened the Model TX and the Model A, respectively running Intel's 8088-2 and Intel 80286 processors and based on IBM's original Personal Computer and the later Personal Computer AT. Delta priced the computers at around US$1,000 and $2,000, respectively. Not long after these computers were introduced, Delta launched a lawsuit against Samsung over a breach of an exclusivity contract, after Samsung began selling their own PC clones directly in the United States. Delta's computers were then pulled off the market, and in July, Delta won a restraining order in a United States court temporarily barring Samsung from selling their PCs directly in the country until October 1987.

=== Deltagold series and expansion (1987–1989) ===
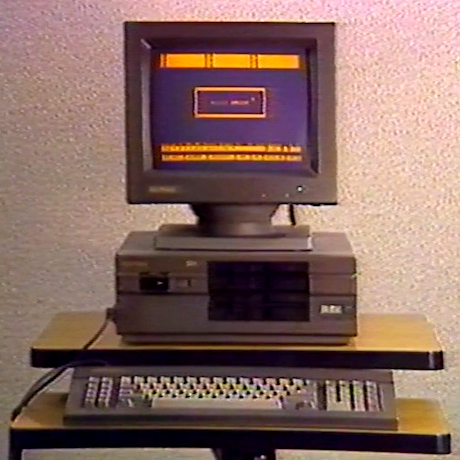
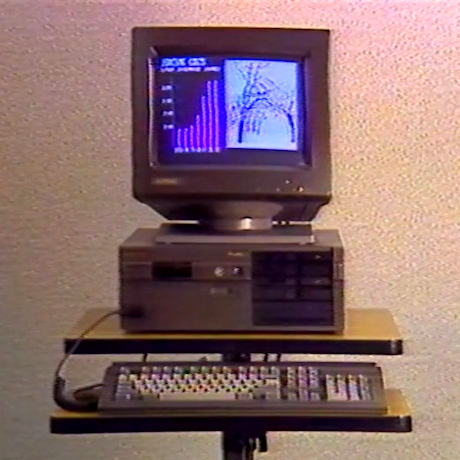
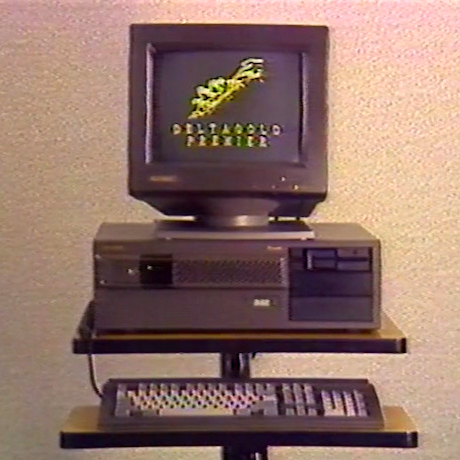
The original Deltagold series from 1987; from left to right: the Elite, the Prestige, and the Premier

The Deltagold Story, VHS training tape included with the purchase of every Deltagold computer

By the summer of 1987, Delta commissioned a Taiwanese manufacturer to manufacture their computers, and in September 1987, Delta finally made their market debut with a family of personal computers under the Deltagold name. This family of computers comprised the Elite, running an up-to-10-MHz 8088 and featuring either dual 5.25-inch floppy disk drives or one floppy and one 20-MB hard disk drive; the Prestige, running a 10-MHz 80286 (competing directly with the PC AT) and featuring either dual 5.25-inch floppy drives or one floppy and one 20-MB or 40-MB hard drive; and the Premier, running a 20-MHz i386 and featuring a 5.25-inch floppy and a 40-MB hard drive. The Deltagold line was offered for sale in both the United States and the United Kingdom. It was frequently sold through mail-order print catalogs and home shopping television networks.

The company's Deltagold computers were notable for their bold aesthetics, featuring two-tone charcoal black plastics and paint jobs, with gold trim elements; a smoked plastic door covering the power button; an LCD clock and calendar that operated independently of the computer; and a microprocessor clock frequency indicator. The vast majority of computers at the time were colored beige, a trend which lasted into the early 2000s. Delta's vice president Jim Patterson justified the decision by stating that, "With computers so much a part of the office environment, we designed our machines to become a part of the office aesthetically, as well as functionally". Popular Mechanics called Delta's computers "quite attractive", while PC Week wrote that they were "allegedly handsome". Delta bundled the Deltagold line with a generous amount of productivity software and included a VHS training tape with every computer, as well as a quick-start guide that clipped to the front panels of the systems.

By May 1987, Delta Computer moved their headquarters from Canton to Mansfield, Massachusetts. The company's computers initially sold well, especially on the East Coast where the company was based, and by the end of fiscal year 1988 Delta raked in $80 million in revenue. The Taiwanese manufacturer whom Delta commissioned eventually became a major investor in the company, infusing Delta with capital to continue developing new products. In late 1987, Delta announced their first laptops, comprising the Voyager I and the Voyager II, both featuring 81-key keyboards, monochrome LCDs with blue electroluminescent backlighting, and single floppy disk drives (the Voyager I possessing a 720-KB unit and the Voyager II, a 1.44-MB unit). In early 1988, the company introduced their first standalone peripheral, the similarly named DM-1200 Voyager, which was a 1200-baud portable external modem.

In May 1988, the company announced a complete product refresh, with the Voyager I and Voyager II replaced by the Voyager 88 and Voyager 286 (featuring 8088 and 80286 processors, respectively) and the Elite and Prestige replaced by the Elite II and Prestige II featuring faster processors and more RAM. As part of the refresh, Delta also replaced the Elite with the DG-630, a clone of IBM's PS/2 Model 30 featuring MCGA video. In January 1989, Delta entered a partnership with Digital Research to bundle Deltagold computers with Digital Research's DR-DOS operating system, in lieu of MS-DOS. In March 1989, Delta began bundling Deltagolds with Digital Research's GEM graphical operating environment. By this point, the company had moved its headquarters to El Segundo, California, retaining its Mansfield building as a sales office.

=== Failed move to Akron and collapse (1989–1990) ===
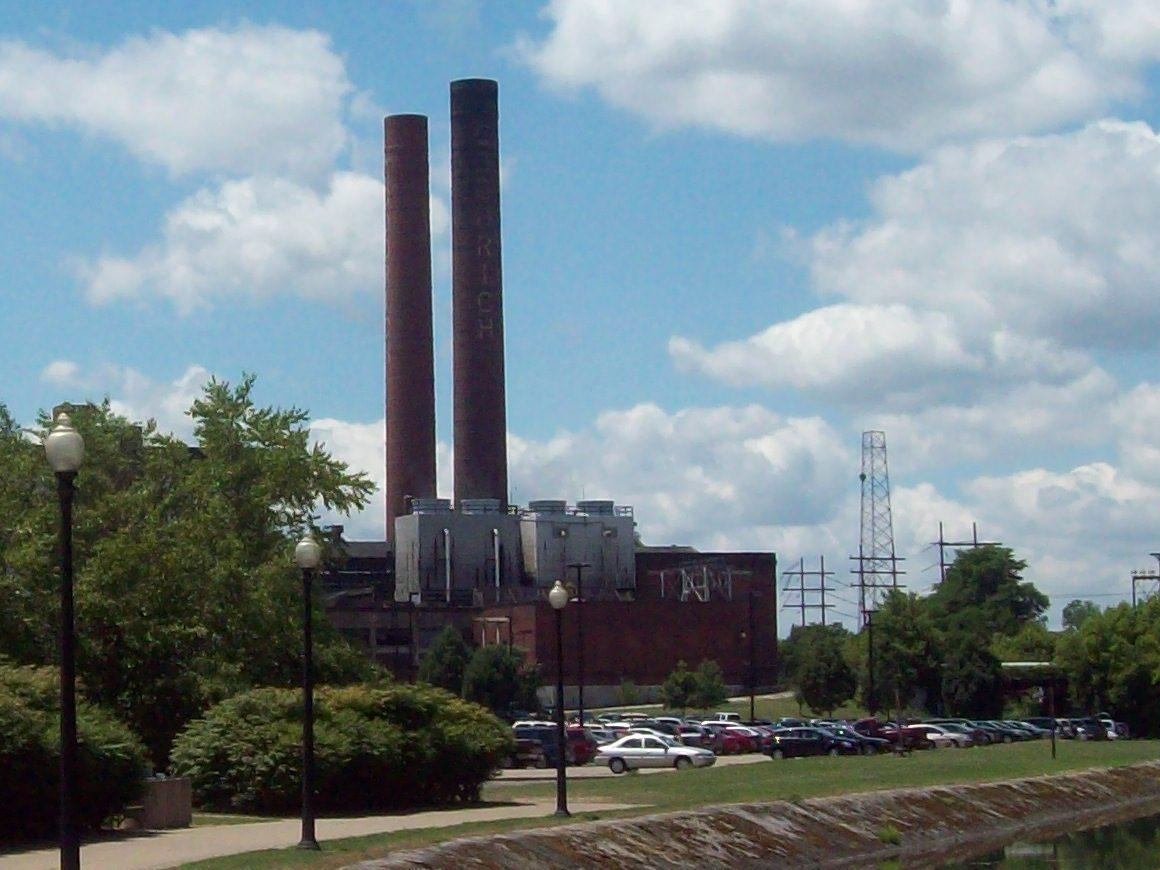
The former B. F. Goodrich Company plant in Akron, Ohio, where Delta Computer planned on moving its headquarters to

Between February and April 1989, the company made an ill-fated and much-publicized move to Akron, Ohio, that ended up falling through amid a fight between Taylor and Delta's board of directors. The move, had it gone through, would have seen its headquarters relocating to a factory formerly occupied by the B. F. Goodrich Company, Delta proclaiming to add between 1,500 and 2,000 assembly-line jobs in the first few years of its relocation.

News of the move was received warmly by the national press, who saw it as a reversal of the trend of American high-technology concerns moving their manufacturing operations overseas to East Asia, and in the Akron press, who were eager for the establishment of a large high-technology firm in the city. While Delta would have retained their overseas assembly contracts, with the prospective Akron plant reserved for final-stage assembly of Delta's products, the company planned on raising plastics production lines for the company's upcoming line of ultra-lightweight laptops, as well as a glass factory for said laptop's LCDs. In mid-February 1989, the company began hiring roughly 100 workers in the Akron area. In March that year, Delta announced that the factory was to open its doors the following May. During their planned move, Delta's International subsidiary invested $825,000 in Cache Technologies, a struggling reseller of IBM PS/2s, in exchange for a majority stake in Cache.

In late April 1989, Taylor abruptly resigned as president and chairman of Delta Computer, putting in peril the company's move to Akron. While executives at Delta claimed that the move was still on, delayed to July, the move ended up fizzling entirely, Delta filing for Chapter 11 bankruptcy in January 1990. Taylor's next startup company, formed to manufacture disk drives for Delta in the wake of his exit from the company, also filed for bankruptcy around the same time. By 1990, Delta had disappeared from the personal computer market. The reason behind Taylor's resignation and subsequent collapse of Delta's move to Akron was allegedly a fight between Taylor and Delta's board of directors, which included investors from Taiwan who also held positions at the manufacturing plants that Delta had been hiring to manufacture their computer systems. According to an insider, these investors rejected Delta's domestic manufacturing plans.

== See also ==
- Blue Chip Electronics
