= MCGA =

MCGA may refer to:

- IBM Multi-Color Graphics Array
- Maritime and Coastguard Agency, in the United Kingdom
- Magnus Chase and the Gods of Asgard, a fantasy novel series by Rick Riordan.
