= Leading Edge Model D =

PC marketed by Leading Edge Hardware

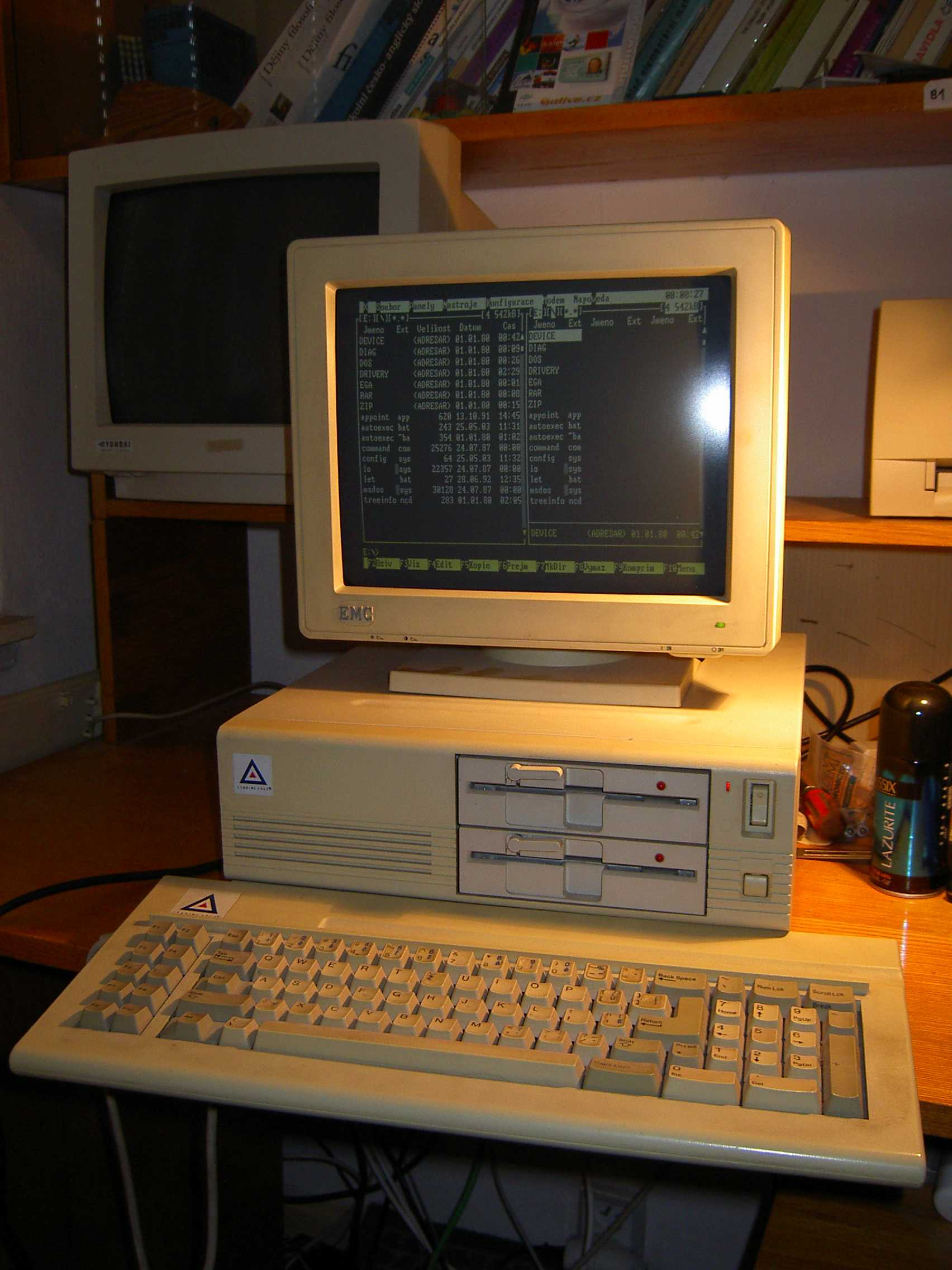
- Leading Edge Model D (dual floppy disk model)
- Developer: Leading Edge Hardware Products
- Manufacturer: Daewoo
- Type: Desktop computer; IBM PC compatible
- CPU: Intel 8088 at 4.77 MHz (early models); Intel 8088 at 4.77 MHz or 7.16 MHz
- Memory: 256 KB RAM (stock)

The Leading Edge Model D is an IBM clone first released by Leading Edge Hardware in July 1985. It was initially priced at $1,495 and configured with dual 5.25" floppy drives, 256 KB of RAM, and a monochrome monitor. It was the first Korean-made PC to be sold in the United States, manufactured by South Korean conglomerate Daewoo and distributed by Canton, Massachusetts-based Leading Edge. Engineer Stephen Kahng spent about four months designing the Model D at a cost of $200,000. Kahng later became CEO of Macintosh clone maker Power Computing.

In August 1986, Leading Edge cut the price of the base model by $200, to $1,295, and increased the base memory of the machine to 512 KB.

The Model D was an immediate success, selling 100,000 units in its first year of production. It sold well for several years, until a dispute with dealers forced Leading Edge into bankruptcy in 1989.

== Hardware ==
The Model D initially featured an Intel 8088 microprocessor at 4.77 MHz, although later models had a switch in the back to run at 4.77 MHz (normal) or 7.16 MHz (high). Earlier models have no turbo switch and run only at 4.77 MHz, while a few of the later ones (seemingly very rare) are 7.16 MHz only. Four models are known: DC-2010, DC-2011, DC-2010E, and DC-2011E. The "E" seems to correlate with the capability of running at 7.16 MHz.

The addition of the Intel 8087 floating point unit (FPU) coprocessor is supported in all Leading Edge Model D revisions with an onboard 40-pin DIP socket.

Unlike the IBM PC and IBM PC/XT, the Model D integrates video, the disk controller, a battery backed clock (real-time clock or RTC), serial, and parallel ports directly onto the motherboard rather than putting them on plug-in cards. This allows the Model D to be half the size of the IBM PC, with four free ISA expansion slots compared to the PC's one slot after installing necessary cards.

The motherboard came in eight different revisions: Revision 1, 5, 7, 8, CC1, CC2, WC1, and WC2. Revisions 1 through 7 are usually found in models DC-2010 and DC-2011, with revisions 8 through WC2 being either in 2010E or 2011E. WC1 (presumably also WC2) is 7.16 MHz only. Due to its tight integration, the Model D motherboard is a nonstandard form factor, so replacing the motherboard with an off-the-shelf upgrade is not possible.

The Model D is preinstalled with 256, 512, or 640 KB of RAM. Lower-capacity machines are user upgradeable to 640 KB. Motherboard revisions 7, 8, WC1 and WC2 come with 768 KB of RAM installed (640 KB available to the user).

Some models have a monochrome/CGA selection switch, with a single port used for both modes. Some models have both a Monochrome and a CGA port, also with a switch to change modes (and ports).

The Model D computers support a special extended graphics mode (EGA): 640x200.

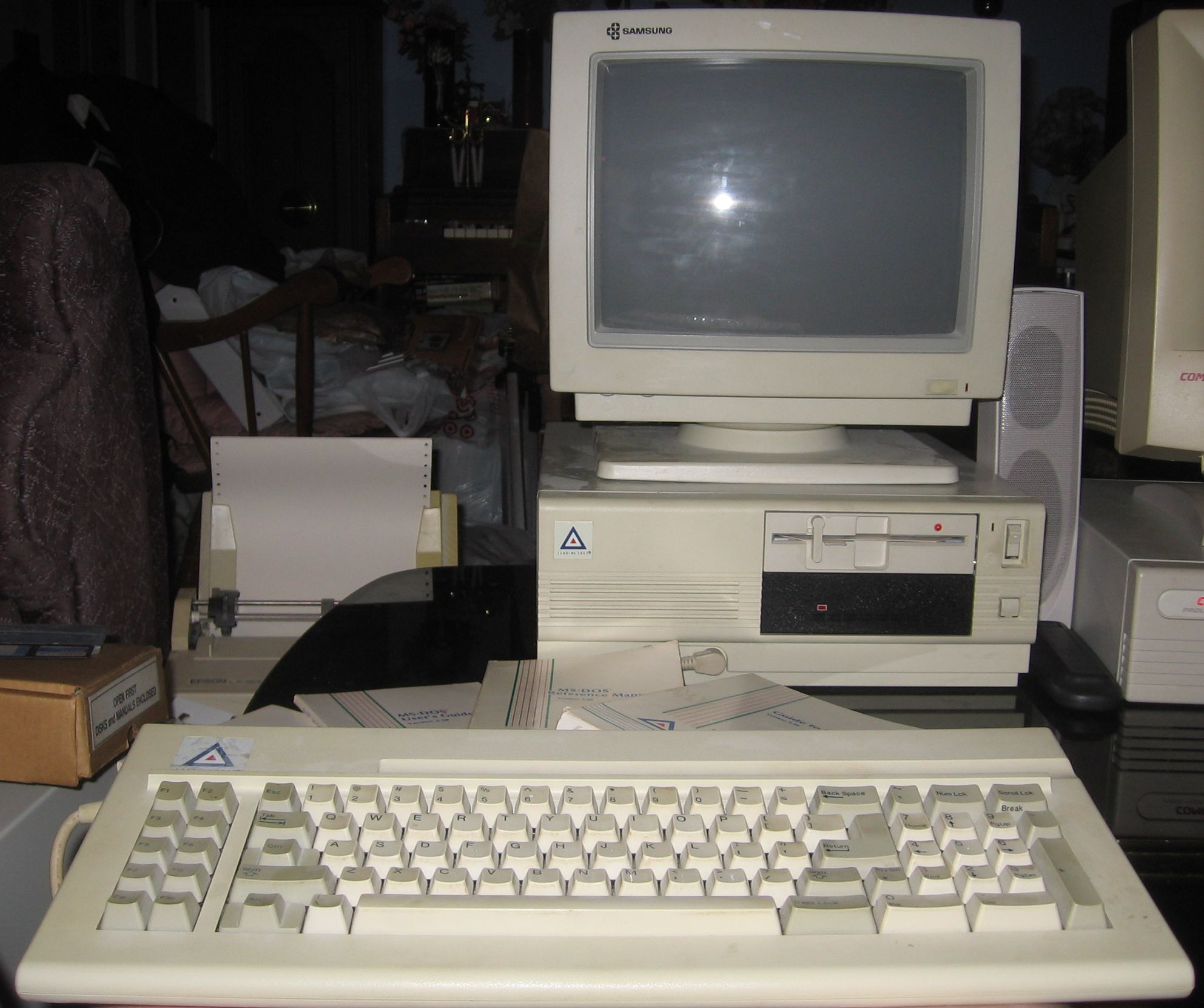
Leading Edge Model D (fixed-disk model)

The buyer had the choice between a floppy disk model and a fixed disk (hard disk) model. The floppy disk model has one or two 360 KB drives, so that the user can run MS-DOS programs on the primary drive and work with files on the secondary drive, if equipped. The fixed disk model has one 360 KB floppy drive and either a 10 MB, 20 MB, or 30 MB hard disk. The model with the 20 MB fixed disk was initially released in February 1986 at a cost of $1,895. Leading Edge dealers had difficulty keeping the 20 MB model in stock. At the time, a Tandy 1200 equipped with a 10 MB drive sold for $1999.

The buyer also had a choice between an amber or a green monochrome CRT monitor.

== Modern upgrades ==
Modern expansions are possible for the Model D, including the use of an XT-IDE 8-bit ISA card, which provides a Parallel ATA IDE port for hard disk. Users wanting to use the XT-IDE in the Model D must set the address of the XT-IDE card within its BIOS to 340h, as not to conflict with the real-time clock address of 300h, which is the default address of the XT-IDE. However, it is possible to disable the Real-Time Clock by removing clip #2 from J13 and deleting the "DEVICE = CLKDVR.SYS" entry from 'CONFIG.SYS'.

The Model D also fully supports the NEC V20 microprocessor in place of its Intel 8088 processor. This provides the Model D with an expanded instruction set and a 5-10% performance boost in normal operations.

All Model D computers support the addition of an 8-bit or 8/16-bit VGA ISA card for VGA graphics.

== Software ==
The unit comes with MS-DOS 2.11 or later, and a special edition of GW-BASIC to support the extended graphics mode.

It also has a diagnostics disk. This disk contained a diagnostics program, and 'PARK.COM', a utility used to park the hard drive heads when the computer was to be moved. Most models also came with the Leading Edge Word Processor, commonly referred to by its acronym 'LEWP'.

To support the onboard real-time clock, a special driver must be loaded at boot in 'CONFIG.SYS', 'clock.sys', or 'clkdvr.sys'

The computer supports the Microsoft Windows operating system up to version 3.0, as it is the last version of Windows to support Real Mode.

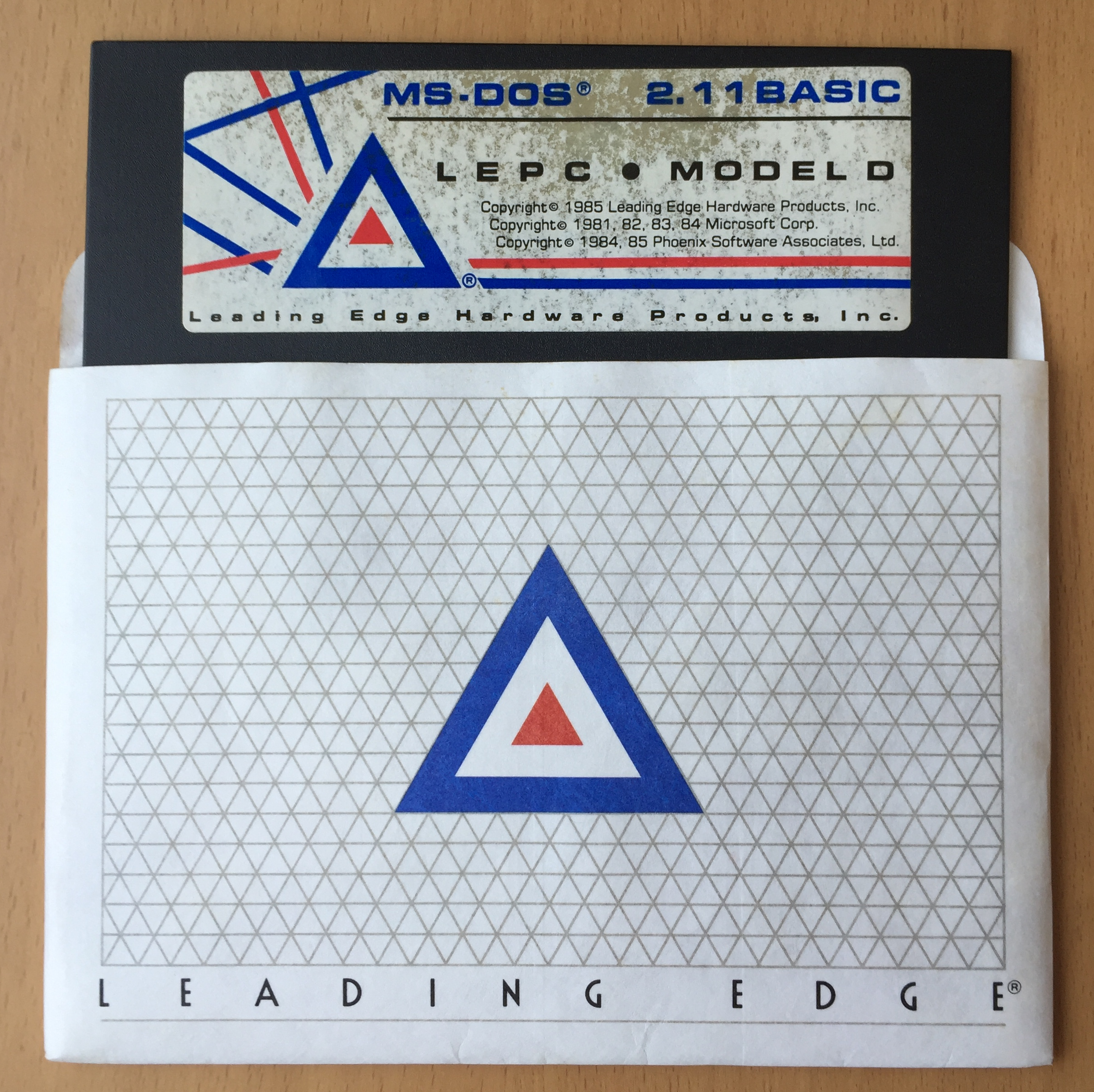
The included boot disk for the Leading Edge Model D in its sleeve.

== Significance ==
Dataquest estimated that the Model D won 1% of the American home-computer market in 1986, its first year of availability. The Model D was the first Korean-made PC to be sold in the United States, and at the time of its introduction, it undercut the price of similar IBM PC compatibles by $500. The $1,495 list price was the lowest of seven compatibles with comparable configurations in a September 1985 InfoWorld chart, and under half the price of the $2,820 IBM PC. Along with the Tandy 1000 and Epson Equity series, the Model D was one of the first IBM PC compatible computers to become popular for home use, due to its low price and good reviews. Many home-oriented software packages for the PC specifically cited the Model D along with the Tandy and Epson models as compatible hardware.

Leading Edge was Phoenix Technologies' first customer for its IBM-compatible BIOS, and the Model D was one of the first PCs on the market to use the Phoenix BIOS. Although advertised as 100% IBM compatible, letters published in the January 13, 1986 issue of InfoWorld identified compatibility issues with several popular software packages and aftermarket hard drives. Syndicated newspaper columnists T. R. Reid and Michael Schrage, writing in April 1986, predicted that the popularity of the Model D would lead to hardware and software vendors specifically testing for compatibility. In spite of these early reports, the Model D sold well. In early 1987, Daewoo was producing 13,000 units per month and failing to keep up with demand. As a result, buyers waited 2–8 weeks before taking delivery.

== Reception ==
Leading Edge said that it had by March 1986 shipped tens of thousands of Model D computers.

PC Magazine in October 1985 named the Model D the Editor's Choice, "clear winner" among six tested inexpensive computers. The review noted its many included hardware features, concluding that it "may represent the next generation of personal computing: about as compact as full IBM hardware compatibility allows, full featured, quite well made, and alluringly priced". The Model D received 4 out of 5 stars from InfoWorld in December 1985. The magazine praised the computer's value, and stated that setting it up "takes less than 20 minutes, even if you know nothing about computers and take your time". InfoWorld earlier gave the bundled Leading Edge Word Processor a very good review, and now reported that the Model D was even compatible with IBM diagnostic software, unlike the Compaq Portable and others. The magazine concluded "We recommend it highly, especially to the budget-conscious beginner". Los Angeles Times that month said that Model D was superior to the earlier Model M, and approved of one price including everything necessary. Citing compatibility issues, the newspaper advised buyers to "run [software] in the dealer showroom before you buy".

The New York Times in July 1985 said that "the quality ... seems good, and the price is right", approving of its compact size and keyboard. Of 20 tested programs, only Cornerstone was incompatible. The newspaper in January 1986 described the Model D as "as fully I.B.M. PC-compatible as one can get without hearing from I.B.M.'s lawyers", citing its superior-to-IBM keyboard, bundled word processor, and low price. The Chicago Tribune in March 1986 praised the Model D and a Kaypro as "the two best computer buys today". Popular Mechanics in October 1986 cited the Model D's low price and keyboard. The Model D received good reviews in other computer magazines and Consumer Reports magazine.
