= Beige box =

Aesthetic style in personal computers

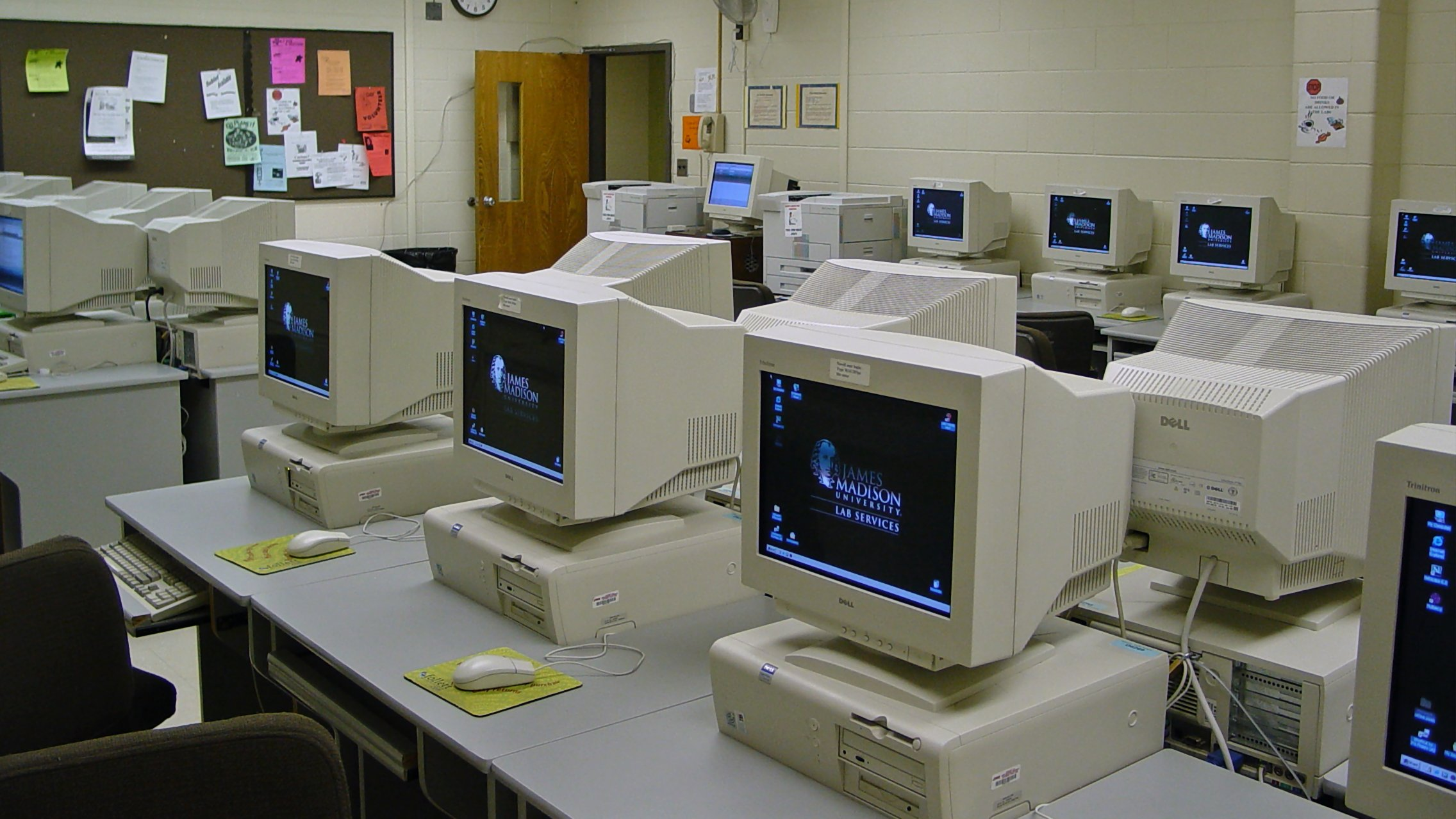
A computer lab in 2002, with beige PCs, monitors, keyboards, and printers

In personal computing, the beige box was the predominant aesthetic style of desktop computers of the 1980s and 1990s, having a boxy beige or off-white case. The trend originated with early mass-market microcomputers like the Apple II and the IBM Personal Computer, whose neutral coloring was selected to blend inconspicuously into corporate and home environments. As IBM PC clones flooded the market, the beige box quickly became the norm in the personal computer industry. By the late 1990s, computer manufacturers began shifting away from the beige box, driven by Apple's introduction of the translucent, colorful iMac G3 series.

The term beige box is also sometimes used to distinguish generic PCs from models made by name brands such as Compaq, Dell, or HP. In the early years of these companies, most of their units were beige as well. More recently, as name-brand manufacturers have moved away from beige (typically switching to black, dark gray, and silver-colored cases), inexpensive generic cases became more distinct as "beige boxes". Today, the term white box has largely replaced this usage.

== Background and heyday ==
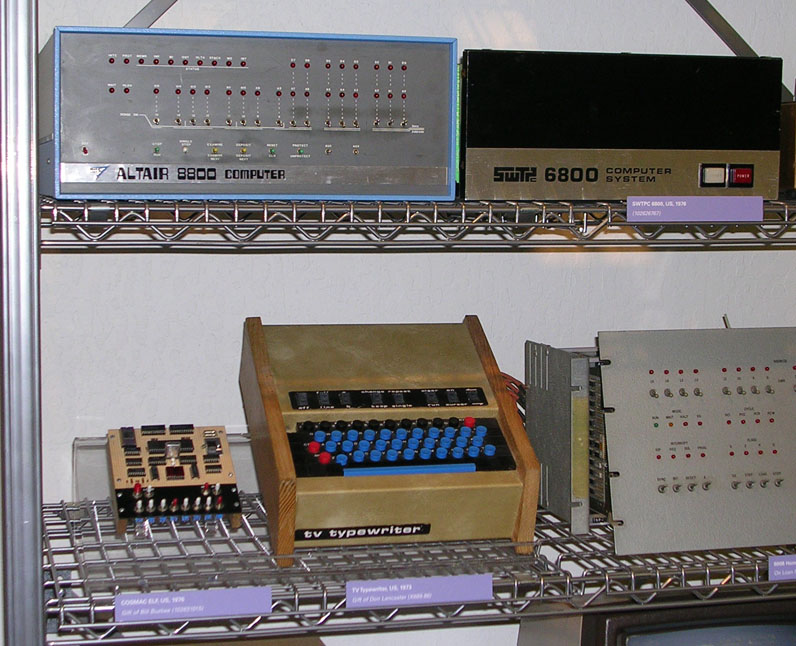
The earliest microcomputers came in an assortment of shapes, colors, and materials.

Computer cases at the dawn of the microcomputer revolution of the 1970s were often assembled out of wood or prefabricated metal boxes, either bought secondhand by the purchaser, in the case of bare kits, or provided by the manufacturer. The majority of early microcomputer hobbyists and manufacturers lacked the budget necessary for injection-molded plastic case parts. At most, some manufacturers, such as MITS, painted the cases for their microcomputers in vibrant colors—bright blue, in the case of MITS's Altair 8800—reflecting standard practice in mainframe and minicomputer design going back to 1959's IBM 1401, whose powder-blue exterior earned IBM the nickname "Big Blue". In any event, many early adopters of microcomputers were indifferent to the physical appearance of their microcomputers and prioritized the electronics inside. While this resulted in a varied array of case designs and colors, these cases were often rough around the edges and were too conspicuous in the home, hampering the mainstream adoption of microcomputers.

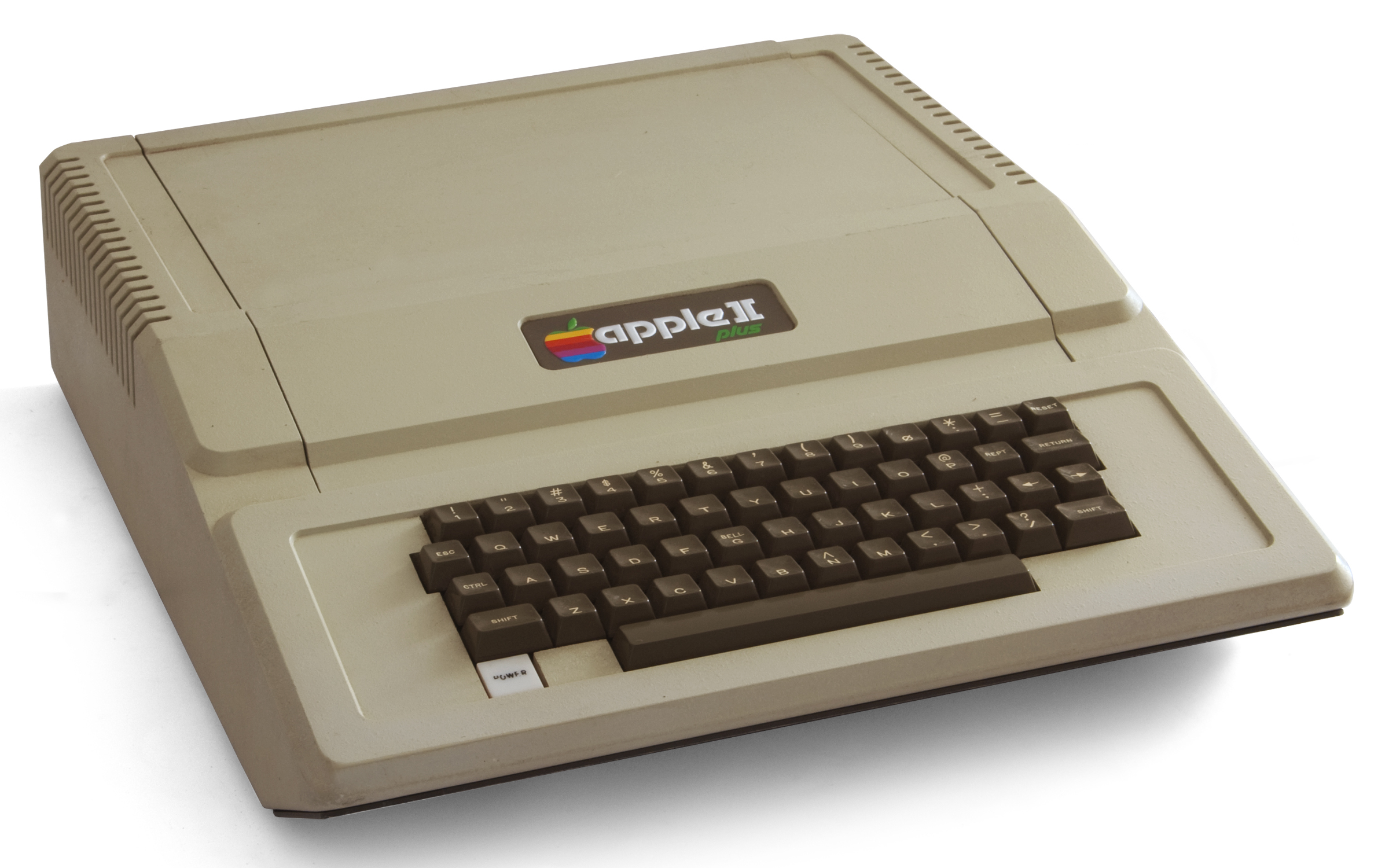
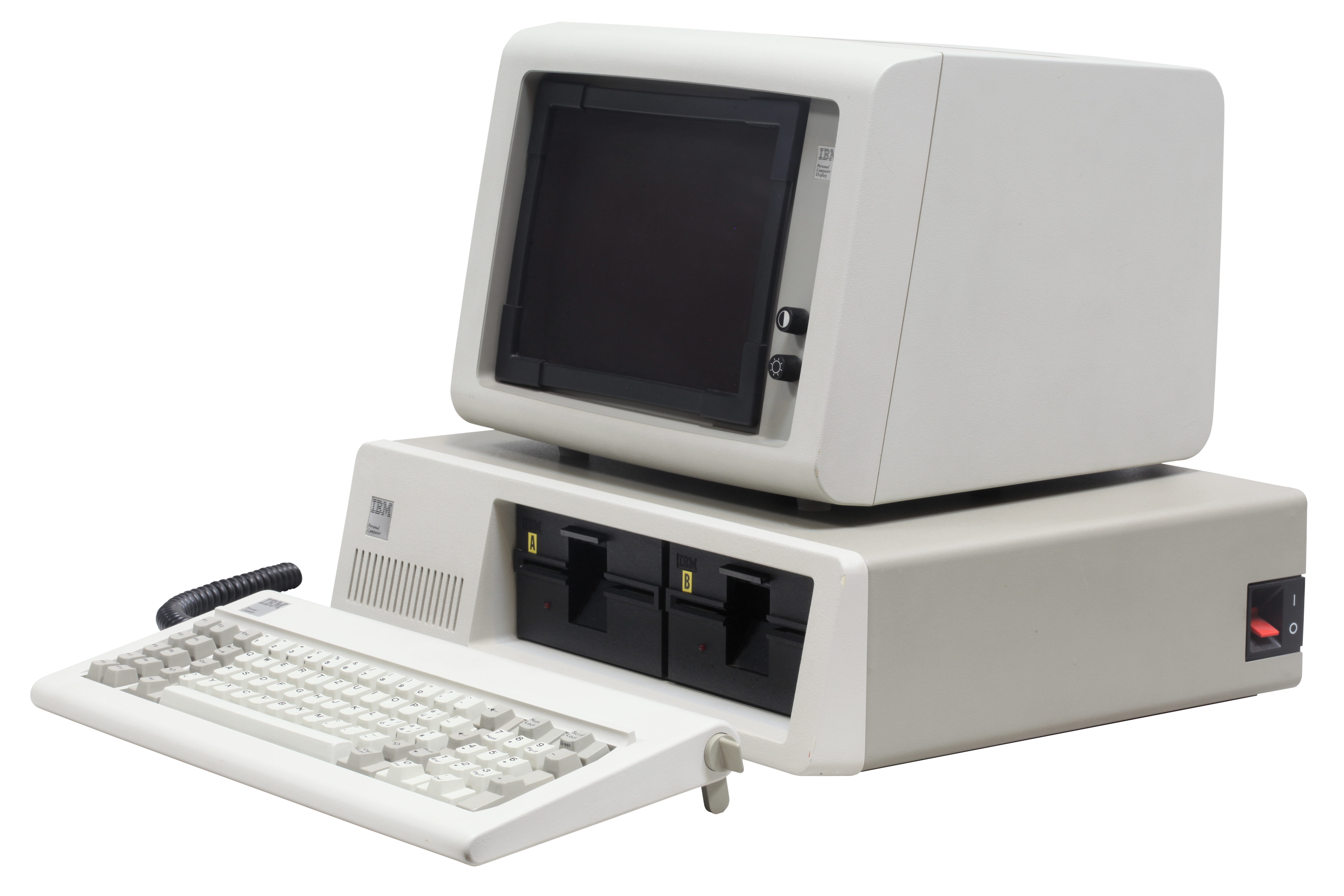
The popularity of the Apple II (left), released in 1977, and the IBM Personal Computer (right), released in 1981, established the use of beige in desktop computers for the next two decades.

In June 1977, Apple Computer released the Apple II, the first commercially released microcomputer with a plastic case. The Apple II's design was rendered by Jerry Manock, who chose to color it beige with input from Apple's co-founder Steve Jobs. According to Manock, the use of beige in the Apple II's case helped it blend into office settings of the late 1970s, which heavily featured earth tones; it was also effective at hiding the appearance of dust on the case. In addition, as many municipalities in Japan and countries within the European Union had laws mandating the use of neutral colors in the office to reduce eye strain, the use of beige made the Apple II a good fit for business use in those territories. Helped by its friendly, inconspicuous appearance, the Apple II quickly became one of the first mass-marketed computers for the home. Its built-in keyboard, rounded corners, and beige color scheme were immediately influential in the fledgling home computer industry and were imitated by many.

Following Apple's lead, in August 1981 the computing giant IBM released the IBM Personal Computer, their first mass-market microcomputer. The IBM PC deviated from the Apple II's design by having the keyboard separate from the main system components, which were housed in a short rectangular box. This system unit, as well as the accompanying keyboard and monitor, were all colored beige. Due to its architecture being largely open standard, the IBM PC spawned a massive market of clone systems, with manufacturers perfectly replicating the IBM PC in both function and form—down to its beige-box case. The explosion of IBM PC clones in the market cemented the use of beige as the standard-issue color for desktop computers.

The rise of the IBM PC standard, according to The New York Times in 2002, coincided with a shift toward workplace democracy, largely inspired by the economic success of Japanese business models. During this era, many companies swapped private offices for cubicles, themselves often colored beige, to foster a sense of equality. The plain, understated aesthetic of these beige-box PCs complemented this new office environment. Although these attempts at workplace democracy eventually became the target of satire through works such as Dilbert, the beige box remained the industry standard for the next two decades. Its longevity was driven primarily by purchasing managers, who prioritized cost-saving through standardization and sought to avoid the visual disarray of differently colored equipment to employees.

While Apple briefly attempted to break away from beige in the early 1980s with the release of the all-black Bell & Howell Apple II Plus, it was a commercial flop, and the company quickly reverted to beige for the release of subsequent computer lines including the Lisa and the Macintosh. (Note: Apple eventually settled on a lighter, de-saturated shade of off-white for their computers during the transition to their Snow White design language in the mid-1980s.) Other notable attempts at black desktop computers during the 1980s include Delta Computer's Deltagold line, Victor Technology's Victor 9000, and NeXT's NeXT Computer—all of which were short-lived in the marketplace.

== Demise ==
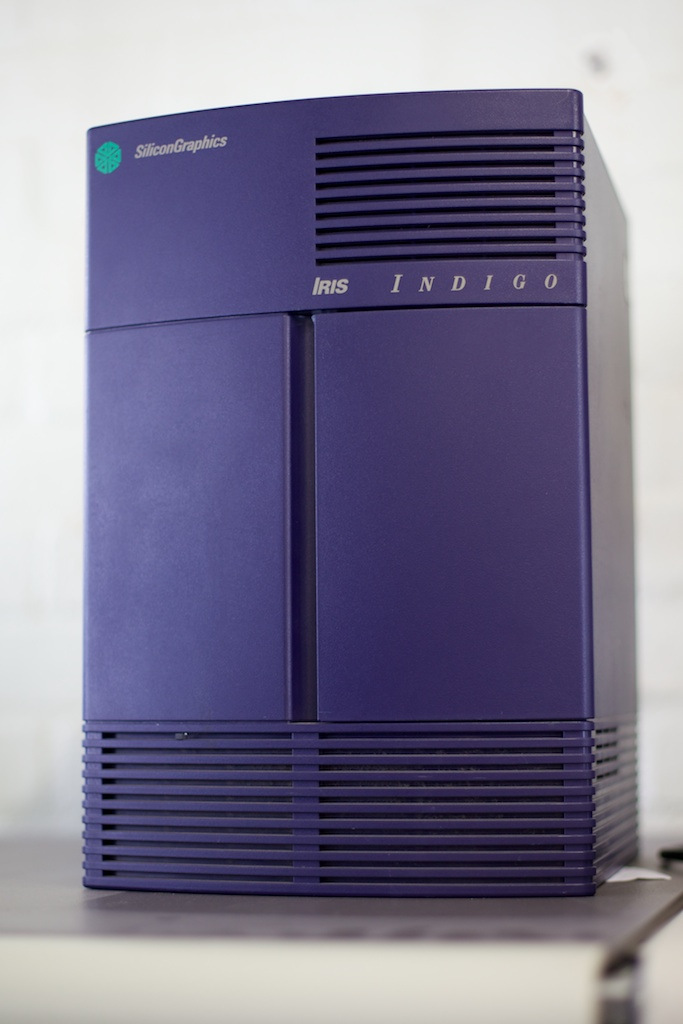
A Silicon Graphics (SGI) Indigo workstation; SGI was one of the first post-1981 computer vendors to successfully embrace color for their case design.

One of the first companies of the post–IBM PC era to successfully embrace the use color in the cases of their desktop computer systems was Silicon Graphics (SGI), who hired the design firm IDEO to render the cases for their workstations in a variety of vivid colors and textures starting in the early 1990s. While never sold to the general public on account of their high price point, SGI's workstations were embraced by creative professionals and research and development firms, with the company intentionally designing their workstations in various colors in order to stand out other workstation vendors, whose designs were more utilitarian in keeping with a more bureaucratic clientele. The start-up company Panda Project copied SGI's approach to color with their IBM PC–compatible Archistrat workstation, released in 1995, which came in an assortment of bright colors.

Unlike desktop computers, laptops and notebooks were offered in a variety of shades of grey and black from their inception in the 1980s and were not confined to beige. While some laptops and notebooks were beige, manufacturers quickly realized that their use on the go precipitated scuffs and finger dirt and switched to darker colors as a result. In addition, as many laptops were being used as companion systems to desktop computers at the office, many users preferred to bring home a darker-colored laptop because they were less closely associated with the beige tones of office environments and connoted executive status. The release of Apple's original PowerBook line in 1991 solidified the use of dark greys in notebook design, with the majority of PC vendors following suit with their own notebooks. One prominent example released in the aftermath of the PowerBook's release was IBM's ThinkPad line in 1992. Designed chiefly by David Hill, the ThinkPads featured an all-black case. IBM were reluctant to release the ThinkPad in black because of German workplace standards that mandated the use of light-value colors in office equipment. While some early models of ThinkPad were offered in beige in Germany, the cost of offering two SKUs for both beige and black models eventually proved too prohibitive. IBM's German subsidiary eventually relented to Hill's original all-black design, with the stipulation that the computer be marketed explicitly as "not for office use". The ThinkPad's design eventually proved iconic and was itself imitated by other notebook vendors.

In 1995, Acer Inc. of Taiwan introduced the Aspire line of desktop computers, featuring either a green or charcoal-grey finish, with a case rendered by Frog Design. The Aspire was a massive commercial success, making Acer a household name in the United States and convincing other manufacturers to experiment with the design of their computers, including Sony who launched the stylish, purple-hued Vaio line of computers in 1996. This development led to PC Magazine and The New York Times to predict the end of the beige-box era. Earlier in 1994, Frog was hired by Packard Bell to redesign their desktop computers; while still primarily beige, they featured user-replaceable, accented trim panels, featuring wavy contours and assorted colors. According to John C. Dvorak in early 1996, advancements in plastic engineering in Taiwan, where many computer vendors had their PCs manufactured, led to Taiwanese OEMs experimenting with colorful computer case designs, albeit with resistance from the buying public in the United States.

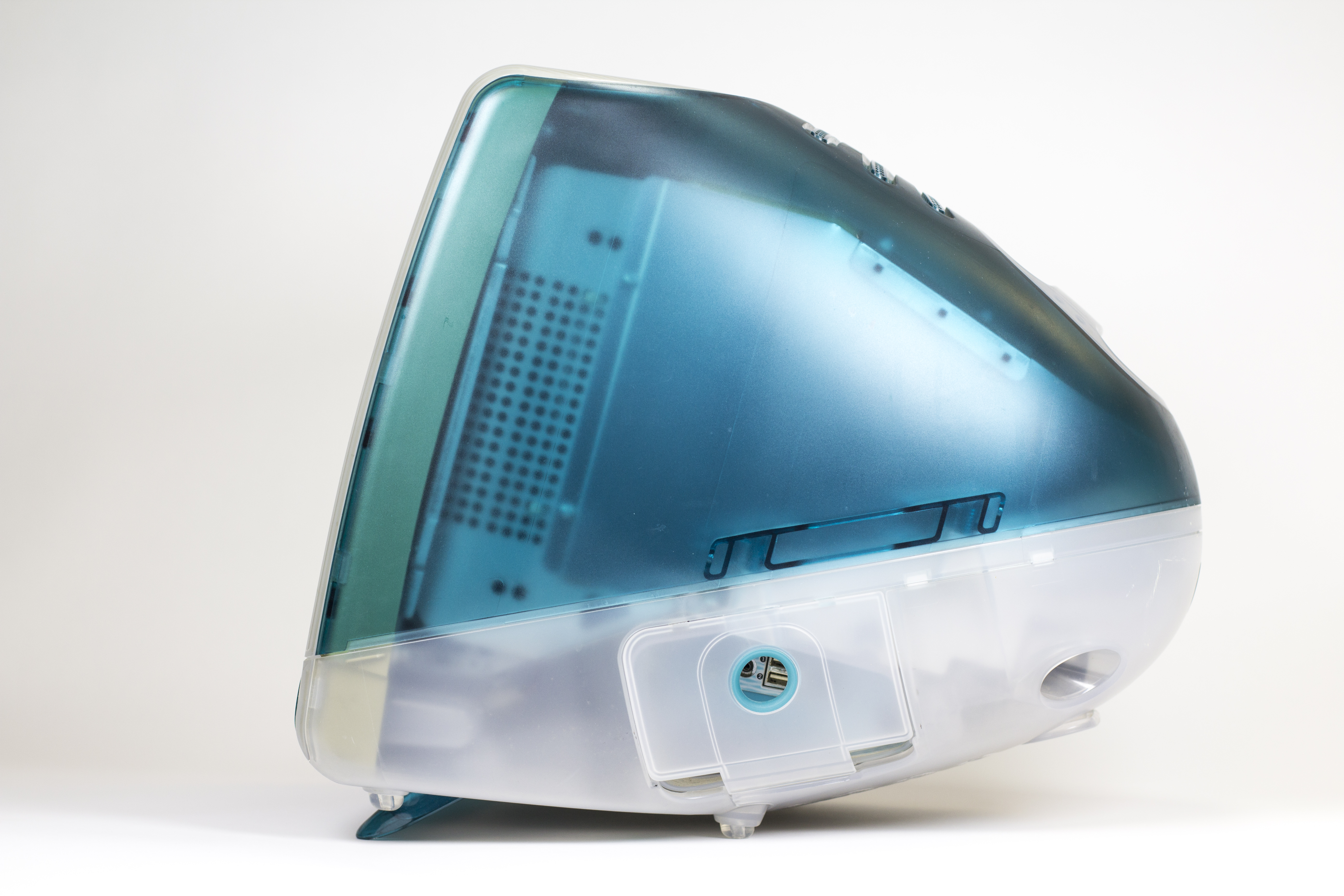
The release of the iMac G3 in 1998 is broadly credited for the demise of beige boxes.

Technology analysts generally credit the release of Apple's iMac G3 in 1998 as marking the decline of the use of beige in desktop computers. (Note: Other analysts contend that the transition from bulky cathode ray tube monitors to flat-panel displays accelerated the beige box's demise.) Released in August 1998, the iMac G3 was designed by Jony Ive based on an initiative from Jobs, who had recently re-entered Apple after his exodus from the company in 1985. The iMac G3 was an all-in-one computer featuring a plastic chassis constructed from colored translucent polycarbonate. Originally only offered in a blue-and-white color scheme, Apple later released a number of different models of the iMac G3 in numerous other colors and patterns. The iMac G3 was an unprecedented success for Apple, selling hundreds of thousands of units in its first year, and it was partially responsible for the company's financial turnaround in the late 1990s. While Apple's competitors initially derided the iMac's industrial design, going into 1999 a number of top vendors released lookalike desktop computers and peripherals cloning its translucent polycarbonate look. Others vendors, like Dell, embraced darker, solid-color designs.

By November 1999, ZDNET reported that the state of product design at that year's COMDEX/Fall supported the notion that "[p]ersonal computers that come in the form of a large beige box are an endangered species". In April 2002, while noting that some vendors still sold beige desktops, The New York Times called the beige box "headed toward extinction".

== Resurgence ==
Starting in 2020, a number of computer hardware manufacturers have released retro-style cases sporting a beige finish, intentionally evoking the look of 1980s and 1990s computer cases while accommodating modern ATX motherboards and peripherals. In December 2020, Origin PC released the limited-edition RestoMod, produced in a quantity of 50, featuring a 3D-printed front panel. In late 2024, SilverStone of Japan unveiled the FLP01, a horizontal desktop case with a beige chassis and matching beige injection-molded front panel. Initially touted as an April Fools' Day prank, the case entered production in early 2025. In May 2025, SilverStone followed this up with the FLP02 beige tower. In July 2025, Maingear released the Retro95, a prebuilt gaming computer housed in a horizontal beige case. Intended as a sleeper-style computer, the Retro95 features an AMD Ryzen 5 9600X processor, a GeForce RTX 5080 GPU, and up to 98 GB of DDR5 RAM.
