= Panda Project =

Defunct American computer company

The Panda Project, Inc.
- Type: Public
- Traded as: Nasdaq: PNDA
- Industry: Computer
- Founded: April 1992; 34 years ago in Boca Raton, Florida, United States
- Founder: Stanford W. Crane, Jr.
- Defunct: June 2004; 22 years ago
- Fate: Remaining assets sold off in April 2000; re-emerged as Coda Octopus Group in 2004
- Number of employees: ~140 (1995, peak)
- Website: pandaproject.com at the Wayback Machine (archived 1997-02-06)

The Panda Project, Inc., was an American computer company active from 1992 to 2000. It was best known for the Archistrat family of high-end workstations and servers, which made use of a custom, 256-bit backplane design accommodating a number of computer architectures. The Archistrat was short-lived and sold in low quantity.

== History ==
The Panda Project, Inc., was founded in April 1992 in Boca Raton, Florida, by Stanford W. Crane Jr. Crane had previously worked for AMP Incorporated and Molex Corporation, two major companies in the field of electrical connectors, in the 1970s and 1980s. In the mid-1980s, Crane founded his first startup, Crane Electronics, to compete with his former employers; that company declared bankruptcy in 1986. Six years later, Crane founded Panda Project in Boca Raton, occupying the 1,900-square-foot former offices of Don Estridge, one of the major architects of the IBM Personal Computer. (Note: The company leased an additional 4,800-square-foot office at the Arvida Park of Commerce in Boca Raton, Florida, in April 1994.) In naming his company, Crane chose a non-technical name to evoke an air of secrecy and to ward off competitors of the company's true nature.

Within two years of founding Panda Project, Crane had managed to court many former employees of IBM, including Joseph A. Sarubbi, another architect of IBM's PC XT; Bruce Smith, a project manager of the PC division at IBM; and Greg Simco, a technical lead for IBM's OS/2 operating system. By March 1995, Panda Project had managed to accrue over a dozen further IBM alumni, including H. L. "Sparky" Sparks, a senior manager at IBM who had helped established the first dealer networks for the IBM PC back in 1981.

Between March and May 1994, Panda Project began preparing to file its initial public offering, which commenced in the third week of May 1994. The $10 million raised from its IPO was funneled back into Panda Project to fund the company's research and development for computer hardware products.

Panda Project's first product was VSPA (Very Small Peripheral Array), a packaging technology for surface-mount integrated circuits. Announced in September 1994, VSPA allowed for a 60% to 70% reduction in the size of ICs versus those housed in contemporaneous plastic quad flat packs (PQFPs). The VSPA package was a three-dimensional design making use of overlapping, receding carriers (similar in shape to a step pyramid) in order to pack more leads into the same surface area. Panda Project co-developed VSPA with IBM Microelectronics at their Manufacturing Technology Center facility in Boca Raton. The machinery to build VSPA ICs was delivered to Panda Project from IBM in April 1995, and the first successful prototypes of a VSPA graphics chip were demonstrated to Cirrus Logic, a prospective licensee by the end of May 1995. The technology was first licensed in 1996 to AMP Incorporated, Crane's former employer.

In 1995, Panda Project introduced their first computer system, the Archistrat, which was a family of Intel x86-based workstations and servers featuring a custom backplane design whose connectors were 256 bits wide and made use of Panda Project's patented Compass connector design. The main components of the computer, including the CPU, chipset, and PCI and ISA expansion slots, resided on a single board that connected to the backplane, while the RAM was contained on its own separate board connected to the backplane, as was its I/O connectors. This arrangement was intended to make the computer easier to upgrade and resilient against obsolescence, since it could theoretically accommodate other 32-bit computer architectures such as PowerPC and 64-bit architectures such as DEC Alpha by just replacing the CPU board. The Compass connector was a pin grid array design, in which each pin is split into four and arranged into quadrant occupying the footprint of the average pin on a normal PGA. This allowed up to 146 contacts per linear inch, or up to 1,100 contacts per square inch. The tower case of the Archistrat eschewed from the beige box designs of its contemporaries in favor of a bulbous design with a bold assortment of colors.

The Archistrat was first unveiled to the public at the June 1995 PC EXPO in New York where it gathered large crowds; it was later featured on the front cover of Byte magazine's October 1995 issue, underneath the headline "The PC is dead". After its release in the first week of October 1995, Network World gave the Archistrat mixed reviews, the magazine's editors praising its innovation but finding its raw performance middling.

In April 1998, Panda Project announced their second computer system family, Rock City, which was a cube-shaped desktop computer running Intel's Pentium MMX processor clocked between 200 MHz and 233 MHz. The Rock City's case had lightning strike patterns etched into the case, which rested diagonally on one of vertices on the provided stand.

Before the company ever produced any Rock City machines, however, Panda Project abruptly announced that they had divested their computer systems division to Round Stone Holdings, a British firm, in November 1998. As part of the deal, Round Stone Holdings acquired all the development rights, tooling, and inventory for all of Panda Project's computer systems. Following the acquisition, Panda Project focused chiefly on commercializing their VSPA chip carrier design, which had failed to gain many design wins after a few years on the market. In 1999, Panda Project sold their VSPA patents and remaining assets to Silicon Bandwidth, a start-up company based in San Bruno, California, leaving the company as a non-praciticing, public shell company. Crane resigned as chairman and CEO of the company in April 2000, he and his wife leaving the company the same month. In June 2004, Panda Project acquired three branches of Coda Octopus, a vendor of seafloor mapping and visualization software, and re-emerged as the Coda Octopus Group, which is still in business as of October 2024.
