= Elephant Memory Systems =

Floppy disk media brand

- Product type: Floppy disks; computer supplies
- Country: United States
- Introduced: 1982

Elephant Memory Systems (EMS) was a brand of floppy disks and related computer supplies introduced by Leading Edge Products for the retail home-computer market in 1982. The name for the product was suggested by Ray Welch to company owner Michael Shane because of the common folk wisdom that an elephant never forgets. Elephant was founded in 1980.

== History ==
Leading Edge created the EMS brand to support its retail strategy. The company reported selling 5 million EMS disks in 1982 and projected 10 million units for 1983.

By mid-1984, Dennison Computer Supplies was marketing Elephant-branded supplies in the United States. PC Magazine promotion directed mail-in coupons to Dennison. By late 1985, advertisements in the United Kingdom explicitly billed the line as “Dennison Elephant,” listing Dennison or distributors for several European markets.

By early 1986, EMS was also sold in Southeast Asian countries.

In June 1989, the parent company Leading Edge Products was acquired out of bankruptcy by Daewoo.
