= Epson Equity =

Series of IBM PC Compatibles

Epson Equity I
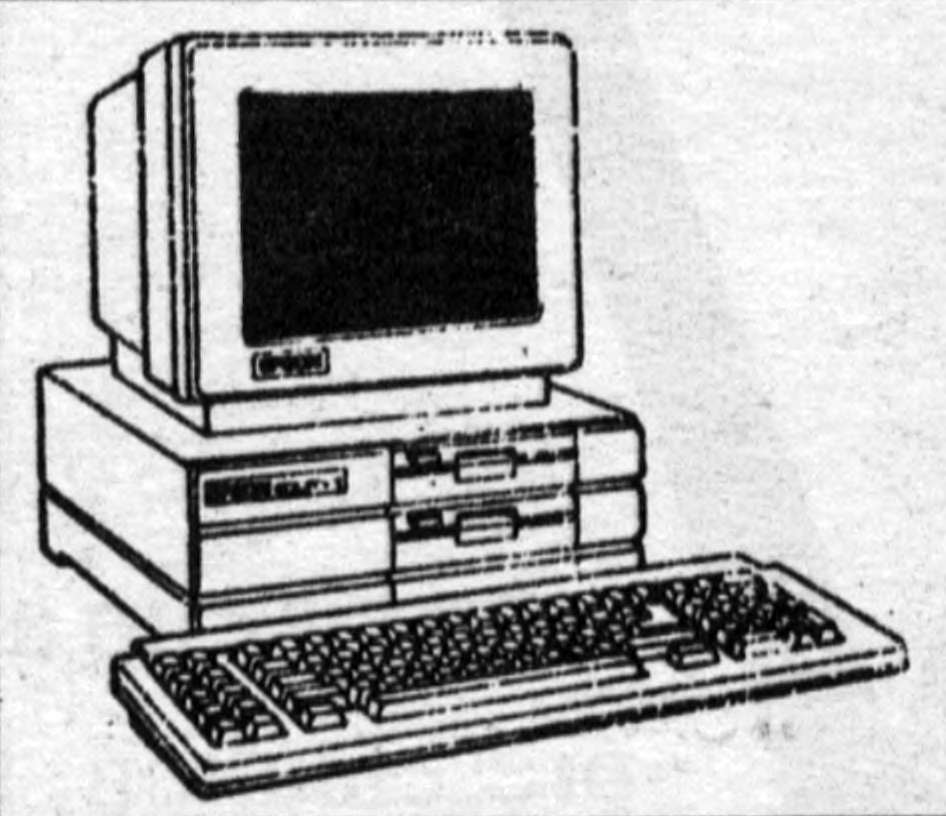
- Drawing of the Epson Equity I from an advertisement in the Puget Sound ComputerUser
- Developer: Epson America
- Type: Desktop
- Released: 1985
- Introductory price: $795 (single floppy drive), $995 (two floppy drives), $1,395 (20 MB hard disk)
- Operating system: Epson DOS 2.11
- CPU: Intel 8088 @ 4.77 MHz
- Memory: 256KB
- Removable storage: 5.25" floppy disk drive
- Graphics: Color Graphics Adapter
- Dimensions: 14.4 (W) x 14.2 (D) x 5.7 (H) in
- Weight: 19.8 lbs.

The Epson Equity series of IBM Compatible Personal Computers was manufactured from 1985 until the early '90s by Epson Inc. Epson was well known for its dot matrix printers at the time and the Equity series represents their entry into the growing PC compatible market. The Equity I was the first system introduced, equipped with an Intel 8088 CPU and one or two 5.25" floppy disk drives.

The original Equity I was a no-frills offering. It ran at the PC's standard 4.77 MHz clock rate, came with 256 KB RAM, expansion above 512 KB required an expansion board, displayed CGA video, had few available expansion slots, only two half-height drive bays, and lacked a socket for an 8087 math chip.

Subsequent versions, the Equity I+ and Apex 100, upped the clock rate to 10 MHz, the standard RAM to 640 KB, supported 3.5-inch floppy drives and hard disks, sported an 8087 socket, and had a "MGA - Multi-Graphics Adapter" card, offering an Hercules compatible monochrome mode, and a new 160x200 eight colors mode. Epson bundled some utility programs that offered decent turnkey functionality for novice users.

The Equity was a reliable and compatible design for half the price of a similarly-configured IBM PC. Epson often promoted sales by bundling one of their printers with it at cost. The Equity I sold well enough to warrant the furtherance of the Equity line with the follow-on Equity II, Equity III, and others based on the i386SX.

== Models ==
- Equity I (8088)
- Equity Ie (8086, only known IBM clone with MCGA video alongside its European model PSE-30)
- Equity I+, Equity Apex 100
- Equity II (V30)
- Equity II+ (80286)
- Equity III (80286)
- Equity IIe (80286)
- Equity III+ (80286)
- Equity LT (V30)
- Equity 286
- Equity 386SX
- Equity 386DX

== See also ==
- Epson ActionNote
