= Multi-Color Graphics Array =

Video subsystem built into the motherboard of the IBM PS/2 Model 30

- Release date: April 2, 1987; 38 years ago

Cards
- Entry-level: IBM PS/2 Model 30 & 25 motherboards; Epson Equity Ie motherboard; Delta Computer DG-630 motherboard

History
- Predecessor: Color Graphics Adapter
- Successor: Video Graphics Array

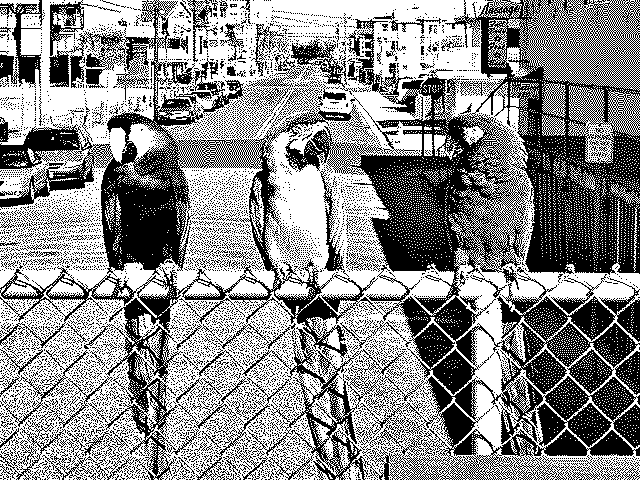
Simulated image as displayed using MCGA 640x480 resolution and color abilities.

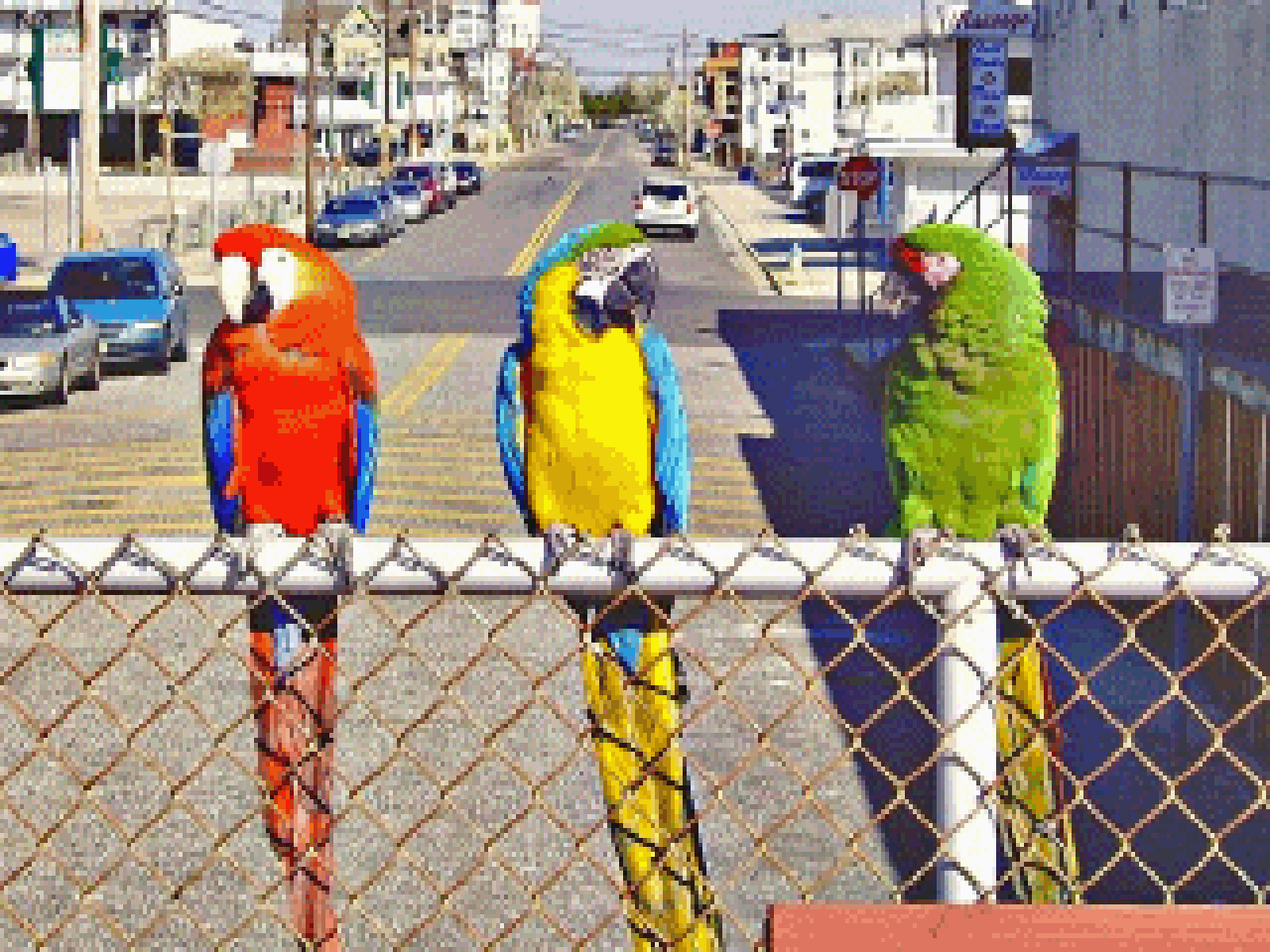
Simulated image as displayed using MCGA 320x200x256 resolution and color abilities.

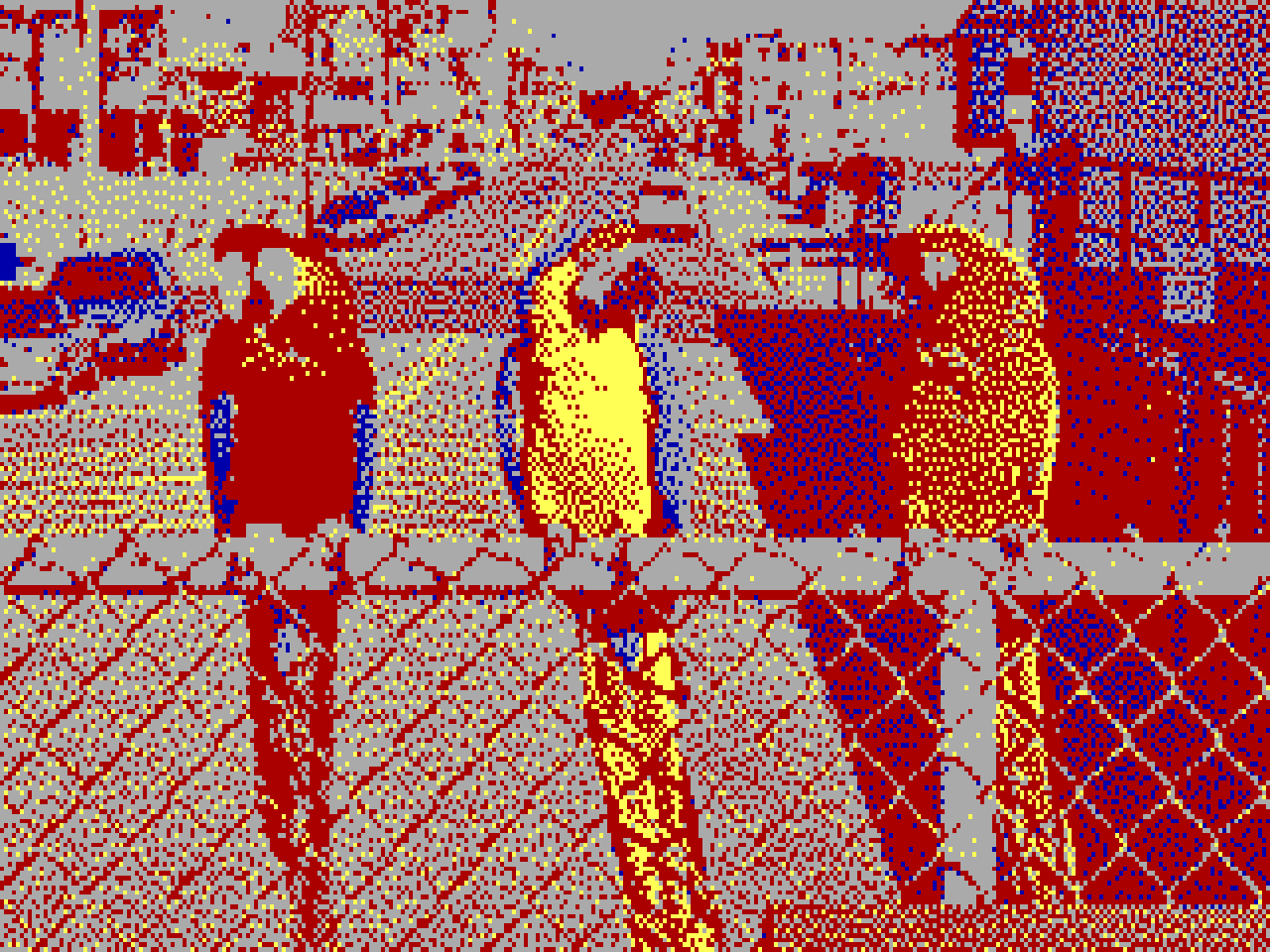
Simulated image as displayed using MCGA 320x200x4 graphics resolution and color abilities.

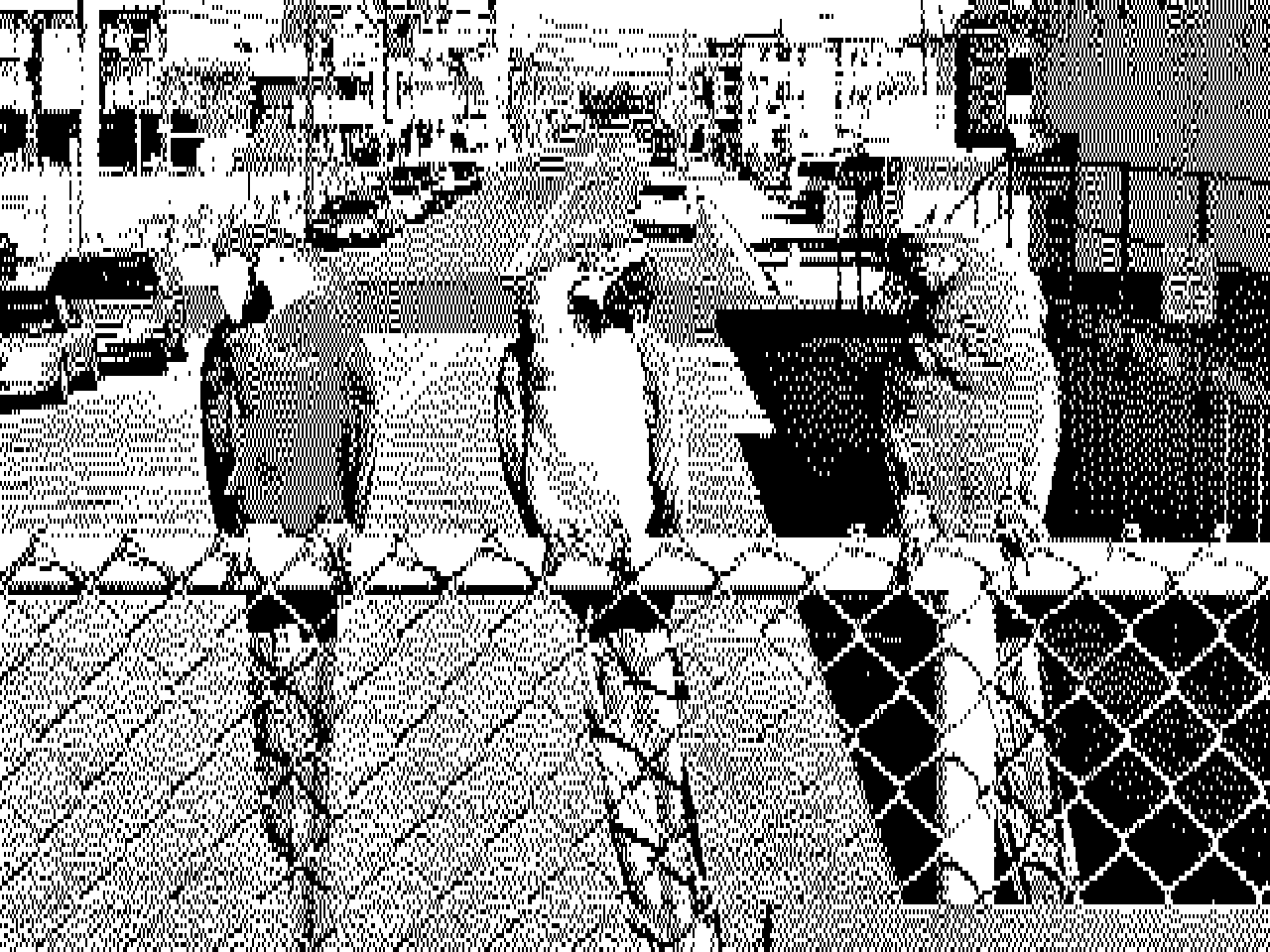
Simulated image as displayed using MCGA 640x200 resolution and color abilities

The Multi-Color Graphics Array or MCGA is a video subsystem built into the motherboard of the IBM PS/2 Model 30, introduced in April 1987, and Model 25, introduced later in August 1987; no standalone MCGA cards were ever made.

The MCGA supports all CGA display modes plus 640 × 480 monochrome at a refresh rate of 60 Hz, and 320 × 200 with 256 colors (out of an 18-bit RGB palette of 262,144) at 70 Hz. The display adapter uses a DE-15 connector, sometimes referred to as HD-15.

MCGA is similar to VGA in that it had a 256-color mode (the 256-color mode in VGA was sometimes referred to as MCGA) and uses 15-pin analog connectors. The PS/2 chipset's limited abilities prevent EGA compatibility and high-resolution multi-color VGA display modes.

The tenure of MCGA was brief; the PS/2 Model 25 and Model 30 were discontinued by 1990, and the only manufacturer to produce a clone of this display adapter was Epson, in the Equity Ie and PSE-30, since the VGA standard introduced at the same time was considered superior.

== Software support ==
The 256-color mode proved most popular for gaming. 256-color VGA games ran fine on MCGA as long as they stuck to the basic 320 × 200 256-color mode and didn't attempt to use VGA-specific features such as multiple screen pages.

Games lacking support for 256-color graphics were either forced to fall back to four-color CGA mode, the two-color CGA mode (or never run at all) due to the incompatibility with EGA video modes (320 × 200, 640 × 200, or 640 × 350, all in 16 colors). Some games, including point-and-click adventures from Sierra On-line and Lucasfilm Games, as well as simulation and strategy titles from Microprose, solved this problem for low-resolution titles by supporting the MCGA's 320 × 200 256-color mode and picking the colors most resembling the EGA 16-color RGB palette, while leaving the other available colors in that mode unused.

Higher resolution titles were often unsupported unless graphics could be converted into either MCGA low or high (640 × 480 monochrome, which would also support 640 × 400 and 640 × 350 with some letterboxing) resolution mode in an acceptable fashion. An alternative approach used by a small number of (generally earlier) games was to use four-color CGA assets but make use of the adaptor's ability to freely change the palette for a slightly enhanced appearance.

== Output capabilities ==
MCGA offered:

- 640 × 480 monochrome (mode 11h)
- 320 × 200 in 256 colors (from a palette of 262,144; mode 13h)

CGA compatible modes:

- 40 × 25 text mode with 8×8 pixel font (effective resolution of 320 × 200; mode 0/1h)
- 80 × 25 text mode with 8×8 pixel font (effective resolution of 640 × 200; mode 2/3h)
- 320 × 200 in four colors from a 16 color hardware palette with a pixel aspect ratio of 1:1.2. (mode 4/5h)
- 640 × 200 in two colors with a pixel aspect ratio of 1:2.4 (mode 6h)

== See also ==
- List of defunct graphics chips and card companies
