= Gas–oil separation plant =

In the upstream oil industry, a gas–oil separation plant (GOSP) is temporary or permanent facilities that separate wellhead fluids into constituent vapor (gas) and liquid (oil and produced water) components.

== Temporary plant ==
Temporary gas–oil separation facilities are associated with newly drilled or newly sidetracked wells where the production potential of the well is being assessed. The plant, comprising a test separator vessel, is connected to the wellhead after the choke valve. The separator allows the fluids to separate by gravity into its component phases: solids such as sand (the densest phase) settle to the bottom of the separator, then produced water and oil which are drawn separately from the base of the separator, and vapor or gas (the lightest phase) separates to the top of the separator vessel from where it is withdrawn. Each of the three fluid phases is metered to determine the relative flow-rates of the components and production potential of the well. In temporary facilities the vapor is generally flared; produced water is disposed of overboard after treatment to reduce its oil content to statutory levels; and the crude oil phase may be diverted to tote tanks for removal and treatment onshore. Alternatively, if the temporary GOSP plant is associated with a permanent production facility, the oil phase may be treated in the installation's permanent gas–oil separation plant.

== Permanent plant ==
Permanent gas–oil separation plant is associated with permanent offshore production facilities. For a full description of such a plant, see Oil production plant.

A gas–oil–and–water separator is called a 3-phase separator.

The gas and oil or condensate are pumped through designated pipelines, while the sand and other solids are washed from the separator and disposed of overboard.

== Reasons for processing ==
=== Multi-phase production ===
Water need not be separated, and a single liquid (oil and water) phase produced together with a separate gas phase. Chemicals are added so that the crude and water emulsify. This process is then reversed at the storage and processing facility by adding demulsifiers that make the water separate out, and is drawn from the bottom of the tank.

After storage, the crude oil can be sold to refineries, which produce fuels, chemicals, and energy products.

=== Pressure ===
The well fluids at the wellhead are at high pressure. Production pressures of greater than 23,000 pounds per square inch (1,600 atm) are not uncommon, but typically are lower than this. The high pressure is reduced at the choke valve to typically 7 to 30 bar at the separator, although the first stage separator could operate at higher pressure c. 250 bar. Modern oil recovery practice may place a hydro-cyclone to replace the temporary GOSP, allowing the water to be removed immediately and re-injected into the reservoir. The hydro-cyclone will vary the flows according to the water content and can also separate condensate from the gas where separate storage and export can be provided for the products close to the production well (e.g. on offshore platforms).

=== Contaminants ===
Crude oil leaving the well may contain quantities of sulfur (e.g. hydrogen sulfide and thiols) and/or carbon dioxide, and is known as "sour" crude. The gas–oil separator will typically partition the hydrogen sulfide and carbon dioxide preferentially into the vapor or gas phase, where it may be further treated. The most usual "crude sweetening packages" use amines to remove the sulfur and CO_{2} content. Crude that contains water is called "wet", and the water can then be bound in an emulsion in the crude to allow pumping through a pipeline. The crude is processed and treated to make it acceptable for the entry and transportation specification of the pipeline, before it can be transported to a refinery for processing.

=== Phase separation ===
It is often appropriate to separate gases and liquids for separate processing. This also involves the separation of oily and water liquid phases.

=== Gas recovery ===
In the past, and in some places today, the gas is considered a waste product and was flared off (burned). Collecting the gas reduces carbon emissions, and produces a marketable commodity.

== See also ==
- Oil platform
- Oil production plant
- Oil refinery
- Petroleum
- Petroleum industry (Oil industry)
- Upstream (petroleum industry)
