= Leading Edge Products =

American computer manufacturer

Leading Edge Products, Inc.
- Industry: Computers
- Founded: 1980; 46 years ago in Massachusetts, United States
- Founders: Thomas Shane; Michael Shane
- Defunct: 1997
- Fate: Dissolved
- Parent: Daewoo (1989–1995); Manuhold Investment AG (1995–1997)
- Divisions: Leading Edge Hardware Products

Leading Edge Products, Inc., was a computer manufacturer in the 1980s and the 1990s. It was based in Canton, Massachusetts.

== History ==
Leading Edge was founded in 1980 by Thomas Shane and Michael Shane. At the outset, they were a PC peripherals company selling aftermarket products such as Elephant Memory Systems brand floppy disk media ("Elephant. Never forgets") and printer ribbons, and acting as the sole North American distributor/reseller of printers from the Japanese manufacturer C. Itoh, the most memorable being the popular low-end dot-matrix printer, "The Gorilla Banana". In 1984 the company sold the computer aftermarket product line and sales division to Dennison Computer Supplies, a division of Dennison Manufacturing. In 1984, they began to use Daewoo parts, and in 1989, they were acquired by Daewoo, as part of their recovery from Chapter 11 bankruptcy. (Shane declared that the costs of a legal dispute with Mitsubishi led to its bankruptcy). In January 1990, Daewoo hired Al Agbay, a veteran executive from Panasonic to lead the company out of Chapter 11 Bankruptcy. In the three years that followed, Agbay and his executive team repaid dealers approximately $16 million and increased annual revenues to over $250 million before a contract dispute severed Agbay and Daewoo's relationship. In October 1995, Daewoo sold the company to Manuhold Investment AG, a Swiss electronics company. Leading Edge had sold 185,000 of its PC clones in the United States in 1994, but in 1995 sales fell from 90,000 in the first half to almost none in the second half. By 1997 the company was defunct.

== Products ==
=== Hardware ===
The first known computer to be sold by Leading Edge is the Model M, released in 1982. By 1986 it sold for $1695 (US) with a monitor and two floppy drives. It used an Intel 8088-2 processor, running at a maximum of 7.16 MHz on an 8 bit bus, compared to 6 MHz for the IBM PC-AT on a 16 bit bus. The 'M' stands for Mitsubishi, their parts provider.

After Mitsubishi and Leading Edge settled Model M-related litigation in February 1986, the latter began selling in March 1986 the Model M-H, an IBM PC AT clone with 20MB hard drive, also manufactured by the former. Leading Edge in June 1986 also began selling the Leading Edge Model D, manufactured by Daewoo. The New York Times said that of the Model D that "the quality ... seems good, and the price is right". A Consumer Reports "Best Buy", it is PC compatible, using the same Intel 8088 16 bit processor as the IBM PC, with two floppy disc drives, 256K of RAM, and an amber monitor. The machine sold for $1495 (US). Leading Edge sold 125,000 Model D computers in the first 13 months, then reduced the price to $1295 (US).

When IBM started supplying 20 MB hard drives as standard for its newer PC-XT's, Leading Edge supplied a 30 meg hard drive standard. They later released a Model D86 (an Intel 8086), Model D2 in 1988 with a 65 MB hard drive for $2495(US) and a 10 MHz processor (an Intel 80286) and Model D3 (an Intel 80386).

In 1993, Leading Edge marketed the WinPro Series of computers. These computers had then an i486 or Intel 80486 processors. The low end model had an i486 SX25 processor. The computers had a 3.5-inch floppy, a 5.25 in floppy, 170MB hard drive, with 4MB of RAM, which could be expanded to 20MB if needed. Windows 3.1 and MS-DOS 5.0 were the operating systems. The cost of a Leading Edge Computer ranged from $1299.99 to $2199.99 during this time.

In 1994, Leading Edge marketed the Wintower 486 Multimedia PC, with 66 MHz processor, 8 MB ram, 340 MB hard drive, 2 floppies, CD ROM, modem, sound card and monitor for a "street price" of $2600 (US).

=== Software ===
The company bundled Leading Edge Word Processor (LEWP) with its computers and sold it separately. The software resembles Wang word processors, but does not emulate them as closely as the more expensive MultiMate. With LEWP in memory, both floppy drives are available for storage. It was introduced in 1983, and sold in 1984 for $100. (U.S.)

InfoWorld in 1984 praised LEWP as "very good software at a low price", and PC Magazine in 1986 ranked it tied for first place among corporate word processors for features and low price. A 1988 PC reader survey found that 2% used LEWP; the same issue approved of version 1.5's documentation, ease of use, and autosave, concluding that it "offers good value for the dollar". A 1990 American Institute of Certified Public Accountants member survey found that 2% used LEWP.

In 1984, Leading Edge also released an innovative database application called Nutshell (developed by Nashoba Systems and distributed by Leading Edge). Nutshell is an early version of FileMaker.
