= Gigabit Multimedia Serial Link =

Automotive high speed video link technology

Gigabit Multimedia Serial Link, commonly referred to as GMSL, is a serial link technology that is used for video distribution in cars. It was developed by Maxim Integrated. Maxim Integrated was acquired by Analog Devices in 2021.

GMSL is an asymmetric, full duplex SerDes technology - which means that it transports data at a high rate in the downlink (or forward) direction, while simultaneously transporting a lower data rate in the uplink (or reverse) direction. It transports power, bidirectional control data, Ethernet, bidirectional audio and multiple streams of unidirectional video simultaneously over a single coaxial cable or shielded twisted pair cable. A GMSL serializer receives video from a standard digital video interface such as HDMI, DisplayPort, Camera Serial Interface (CSI-2) or Display Serial Interface (DSI) and can transmit it over a cable of up to 15 m in length. The data is received by a GMSL deserializer that can output it on another standard digital video interface. GMSL video transport may be unprotected or encrypted using HDCP.

== History of GMSL ==
High resolution flat-panel displays in vehicles started becoming a standard part of in-car entertainment systems in early 2000 time frame. Backup camera systems were mandated in the US by Congress in 2008, and were widely adopted in cars from 2008 to 2011. The first technologies dedicated to connecting these displays and cameras were FPD-Link from National Semiconductor and GMSL from Maxim Integrated. GMSL was introduced in 2008, and supported up to 3.125 Gb/s data rate in the downlink direction. This was sufficient to deliver uncompressed video from the head unit to high-definition displays commonly used in-car entertainment systems, and to transport video from cameras to a CPU.

As increasing display resolutions and camera resolutions were adopted by the automotive industry, there was a need to transport higher video data rates in automotive video systems. The second generation of GMSL, known as GMSL2 with data rate up to 6 Gbit/s became available in 2018. GMSL2 supports FHD displays and cameras with resolution up to 8 megapixels. Display Stream Compression was added in GMSL2 to increase the capacity of the link as needed to support 4k displays over a single cable. GMSL2 was also the first generation GMSL to support Ethernet tunneling. GMSL2 supports 187.5 Mbit/s or 1.5 Gbit/s data rates on the reverse channel.

The 3rd generation GMSL devices (GMSL3) became available in 2021. GMSL3 has 12 Gbit/s forward data rate, supporting aggregation of multiple cameras, daisy chaining of displays and multiple 4k display video streams over a single cable.

== Automotive Applications ==
GMSL is primarily used in In-Vehicle Infotainment (IVI) systems and Advanced driver-assistance system (ADAS) in vehicles.

In IVI systems, GMSL links connect displays, such as electronic instrument clusters, navigation systems, center console displays, and rear seat entertainment displays to the vehicle’s head-unit. The full-duplex nature of the link allows transport of video, touch and haptics information, audio and display control, simultaneously over the same cable.

In ADAS systems, GMSL links are used to connect cameras to electronic control units. Examples of such cameras are backup cameras, surround view cameras, blind spot monitor cameras, forward-looking cameras and driver monitoring cameras. The GMSL link provides camera power, camera control, fault reporting and video transport across a single, coaxial cable.

ADAS systems are considered safety-critical systems, and typically have an Automotive Safety Integrity Level (ASIL) rating, specified according to the ISO 26262 standard. GMSL devices have built-in fault detection and reporting functions to allow design of such ASIL-rated systems.

There are other uses for GMSL in the vehicle. Examples include control data distribution for adaptive driving beam headlights, transport of radar and lidar data in autonomous vehicles, and video data transport between domain controllers in a vehicle. For example, surround view camera data can be transported from the ADAS domain controller to the head unit to be displayed to the driver.

Automotive electronics must operate in an environment with extreme temperatures, high levels of electrical crosstalk and transients. GMSL devices must meet or exceed the requirements of the AEC-Q100 automotive reliability standard for integrated circuits, and the ISO 10605 standard for automotive electrostatic discharge (ESD).

== Adoption ==
At the AutoSens conference in Brussels in 2022, it was reported that more than 500 million GMSL links are installed in cars from more than 25 car manufacturers.
