= Universal Flash Storage =

Flash storage specification

Universal Flash Storage (UFS) is a flash storage specification for digital cameras, mobile phones and consumer electronic devices, positioned as a replacement for eMMCs and SD cards. It was designed to bring higher data transfer speed and increased reliability to flash memory storage, while reducing market confusion and removing the need for different adapters for different types of cards. The standard encompasses both packages permanently embedded (via ball grid array package) within a device (eUFS), and removable UFS memory cards.

== Overview ==
UFS uses NAND flash. It may use multiple stacked 3D TLC NAND flash dies (as of 2026 TLC or QLC usually used for UFS) with an integrated controller.

The proposed flash memory specification is supported by consumer electronics companies such as Nokia, Sony Ericsson, Texas Instruments, STMicroelectronics, Samsung, Micron, and SK Hynix. The electrical interface for UFS uses the M-PHY, developed by the MIPI Alliance, a high-speed serial interface targeting 2.9 Gbit/s per lane with up-scalability to 5.8 Gbit/s per lane. UFS implements a full-duplex serial LVDS interface that scales better to higher bandwidths than the 8-lane parallel and half-duplex interface of eMMCs. Unlike eMMC, Universal Flash Storage is based on the SCSI architectural model and supports SCSI Tagged Command Queuing. The standard is developed by, and available from, the JEDEC Solid State Technology Association.

=== Software support ===
The Linux kernel supports UFS. OpenBSD 7.3 and later support UFS. Windows 10 and later support UFS.

== History ==
In 2010, the Universal Flash Storage Association (UFSA) was founded as an open trade association to promote the UFS standard.

In September 2013, JEDEC published JESD220B UFS 2.0 (update to UFS v1.1 standard published in June 2012). JESD220B Universal Flash Storage v2.0 offers increased link bandwidth for performance improvement, a security features extension and additional power saving features over the UFS v1.1.

On 30 January 2018 JEDEC published version 3.0 of the UFS standard, with a higher 11.6 Gbit/s data rate per lane (1450 MB/s) with the use of MIPI M-PHY v4.1 and UniProSM v1.8. At the MWC 2018, Samsung unveiled embedded UFS (eUFS) v3.0 and uMCP (UFS-based multi-chip package) solutions.

On 30 January 2020 JEDEC published version 3.1 of the UFS standard. UFS 3.1 introduced Write Booster, Deep Sleep, Performance Throttling Notification and Host Performance Booster for faster, more power efficient, and cheaper UFS solutions. The Host Performance Booster feature is optional. Before the UFS 2.2 standard and the UFS 3.1 standard, the SLC buffer feature was optional on UFS devices, which is a de facto feature on personal SSDs. The Write Booster feature was brought to UFS 2.2 in August 2020.

The "Write Booster" is a buffer with a higher speed than the persistent storage which temporarily stores new data before it is written to the persistent storage. It uses idle time, meaning time where no data is accessed by the device's operating system, to "flush" the buffer's contents to the persistent storage.

In 2022 Samsung announced version 4.0 doubling from 11.6 Gbit/s to 23.2 Gbit/s with the use of MIPI M-PHY v5.0 and UniPro v2.0. UFS 4.0 introduces File Based Optimization.

As of Q1 2025, UFS 4.1 introduces Zoned Storage for UFS.

In February 2026, JEDEC announced UFS 5.0 together with the UFS Host Controller Interface (UFSHCI) 5.0. The standard uses MIPI M-PHY v6.0 and UniPro v3.0, whose new High-Speed Gear 6 (HS-G6) doubles the maximum data rate of HS-G5 to 46.6 Gbit/s per lane per direction, giving an effective read/write throughput of approximately 10.8 GB/s over two lanes while remaining compatible with UFS 4.x hardware. In June 2026, Samsung announced the first UFS 5.0 storage solution, rated at up to 10.8 GB/s sequential read and 9.5 GB/s sequential write, with mass production planned for the fourth quarter of 2026.

== Version comparison ==
=== UFS ===
Version	Introduced	Bandwidth per lane	Maximum lanes	Maximum bandwidth	M-PHY version	UniPro version
1.0	2011-02-24	300 MB/s	1	300 MB/s	1.0	1.4
1.1	2012-06-25	300 MB/s	1	300 MB/s	1.0	1.4
2.0	2013-09-18	600 MB/s	2	1200 MB/s	3.0	1.6
2.1	2016-04-04	600 MB/s	2	1200 MB/s	3.0	1.6
2.2	2020-08	600 MB/s	2	1200 MB/s	3.0	1.6
3.0	2018-01-30	1450 MB/s	2	2900 MB/s	4.1	1.8
3.1	2020-01-30	1450 MB/s	2	2900 MB/s	4.1	1.8
4.0	2022-08-17	2900 MB/s	2	5800 MB/s	5.0	2.0
4.1 (Pro)	2025-01-08	2900 MB/s	2	5800 MB/s	5.0	2.0
5.0	2026-02-26	5400 MB/s	2	10800 MB/s	6.0	3.0

=== UFS Card ===
Version	Introduced	Bandwidth per lane	Maximum lanes	Maximum bandwidth	M-PHY version	UniPro version
1.0	2016-03-30	600 MB/s	1	600 MB/s	3.0	1.6
1.1	2018-01-30	600 MB/s	1	600 MB/s	3.0	1.6
3.0	2020-12-08	1200 MB/s	1	1200 MB/s	4.1	1.8

== Implementation ==
- UFS 2.0 has been implemented in Snapdragon 820 and 821. Kirin 950 and 955. Exynos 7420. Nvidia Jetson AGX Xavier SOMs
- UFS 2.1 has been implemented in Snapdragon 712 (710&720G), 730G, 732G, 835, 845 and 855. Kirin 960, 970 and 980. Exynos 9609, 9610, 9611, 9810 and 980.
- UFS 3.0 has been implemented in Snapdragon 855, 855+, 860, 865, Exynos 9820–9825, and Kirin 990.
- UFS 3.1 has been implemented in Snapdragon 855+/860, Snapdragon 865, Snapdragon 870, Snapdragon 888, Exynos 2100, Exynos 2200, Snapdragon 7s Gen 2 and MediaTek Kompanio 540.
- UFS 4.0 has been implemented in Google Tensor G5, MediaTek Dimensity 9200, MediaTek Dimensity 8300 and Snapdragon 8 Gen 2.
- UFS 5.0 has been implemented in Qualcomm Snapdragon 8 Elite Gen 6 and MediaTek Dimensity 9600 Pro.

== Complementary UFS standards ==
On 30 March 2016, JEDEC published version 1.0 of the UFS Card Extension Standard (JESD220-2), which offered many of the features and much of the same functionality as the existing UFS 2.0 embedded device standard, but with additions and modifications for removable cards.

Also in March 2016, JEDEC published version 1.1 of the UFS Unified Memory Extension (JESD220-1A), version 2.1 of the UFS Host Controller Interface (UFSHCI) standard (JESD223C), and version 1.1A of the UFSHCI Unified Memory Extension standard (JESD223-1A).

On 30 January 2018, the UFS Card Extension standard was updated to version 1.1 (JESD220-2A), and the UFSHCI standard was updated to version 3.0 (JESD223D), to align with UFS version 3.0.

== Rewrite cycle life ==
A UFS drive's rewrite life cycle affects its lifespan. There is a limit to how many write/erase cycles a flash block can accept before it produces errors or fails altogether. Each write/erase cycle causes a flash memory cell's oxide layer to deteriorate. The reliability of a drive is based on three factors: the age of the drive, total terabytes written over time, and drive writes per day. This is typical of flash memory in general. For example, high-end smartphones, and devices such as set-top boxes may adopt UFS flash with high terabytes written.

== See also ==
- Memory card
- NVM Express (NVMe)
- Solid-state drive
