= DigRF =

The DigRF working group was formed as a MIPI Alliance (MIPI) working group in April 2007. The group is focused on developing specifications for wireless mobile RFIC to base-band IC (BBIC) interfaces in mobile devices.

The group's current charter is split into short-term and long-term development efforts. The short-term development will focus on a specification targeted for completion by end of 2007 for LTE and WiMax air interface standards. The longer term development will focus on future air interface standards which promise further improvements in high speed, data optimized traffic. In addition, the future work will seek to harmonize efforts with the MIPI's PHY and UniPro working groups.

These specifications will describe the logical, electrical and timing characteristics of the digital RF-BB Interface with sufficient detail to allow physical implementation of the interface, and with sufficient rigor that implementations of the interface from different suppliers are fully compatible at the physical level.

There is DigRF version v1.12 for usage in GSM/EDGE handsets, which was specified in 2004. DigRF v3.09 from the year 2006 with its 312 Mbit/s can additionally handle UMTS. The present DigRF v4 draft offers Gbit/s bandwidth for LTE and WiMax.
