= SPMI =

SPMI may refer to:

- Saint Petersburg Mining Institute
- Serious Persistent Mental Illness
- Socialist Party of Michigan, a political party
- System Power Management Interface, in mobile technology
