= Camera Serial Interface =

Specification that defines an interface between a camera and a host processor

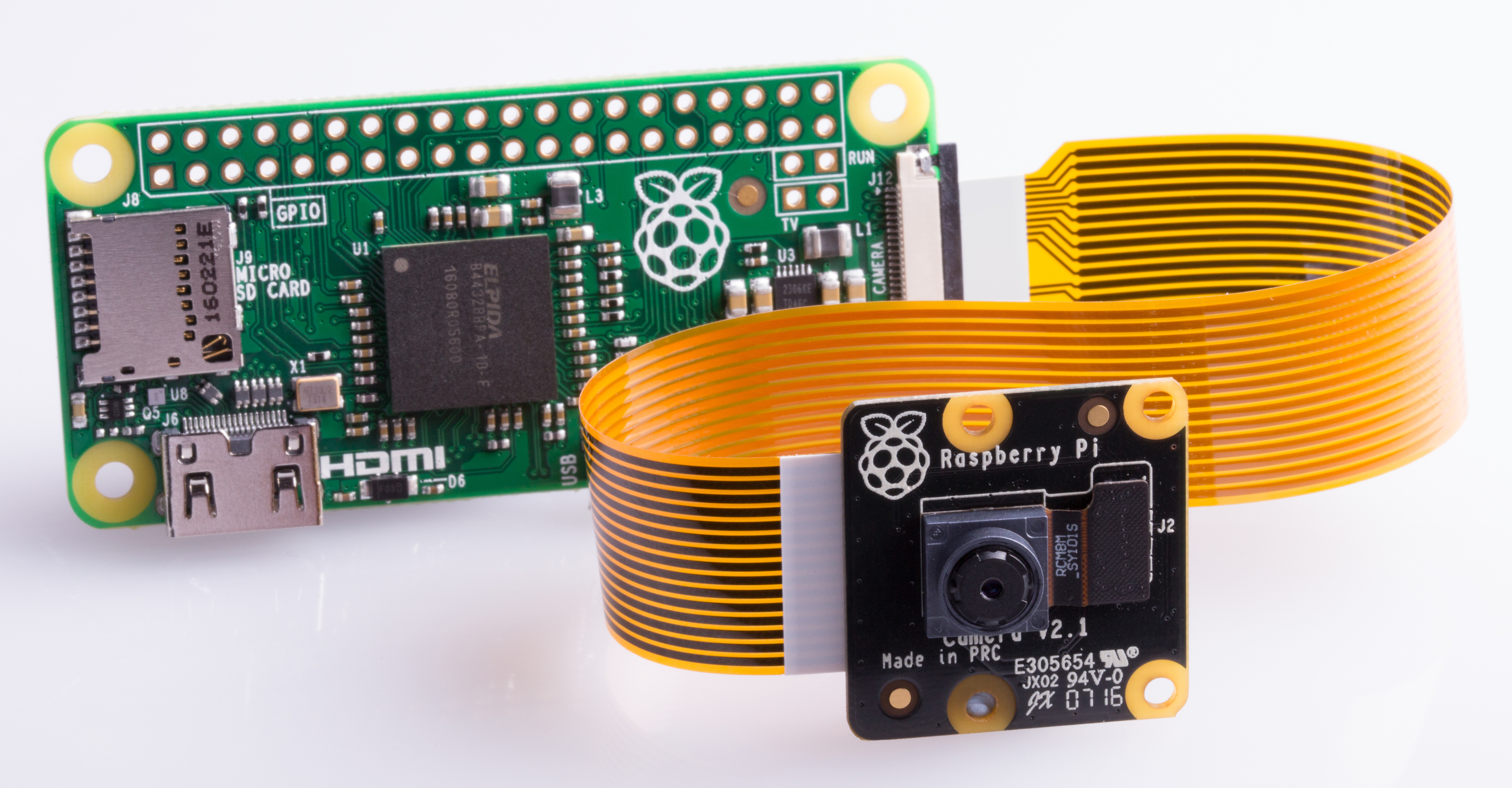
Camera plugged into the Camera Serial Interface connector on Raspberry Pi single-board computer

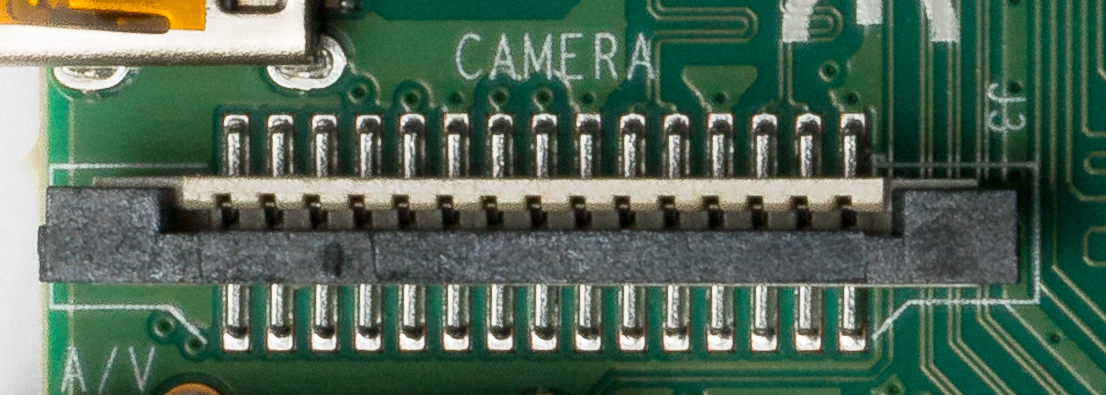
Camera Serial Interface connector on a Raspberry Pi computer

The Camera Serial Interface (CSI) is a specification of the Mobile Industry Processor Interface (MIPI) Alliance. It defines an interface between a camera and a host processor (like SoC or IPU).

The latest active interface specifications are: CSI-2 v4.2 (Dec 2025), CSI-3 v1.1 (March 2014), and CCS v1.1.1 (April 2023).

== Standards ==
=== CSI-1 ===
CSI-1 was the original standard MIPI interface for cameras. It emerged as an architecture to define the interface between a camera and a host processor. Its successors were MIPI CSI-2 and MIPI CSI-3, two standards that are still evolving.

=== CSI-2 ===
The MIPI CSI-2 v1.0 specification was released in 2005. It uses either D-PHY or C-PHY (Both standards are set by the MIPI Alliance) as a physical layer option. The protocol is divided into the following layers: physical, lane merger, low-level protocol, pixel-to-byte conversion, and application.

In April 2017, the CSI-2 v2.0 specification was released. CSI-2 v2.0 brought support for RAW-16 and RAW-20 color depth, increase virtual channels from 4 to 32, Latency Reduction and Transport Efficiency (LRTE), Differential Pulse-Code Modulation (DPCM) compression and scrambling to reduce Power Spectral Density.

In September 2019, the CSI-2 v3.0 specification was released. CSI-2 v3.0 introduced Unified Serial Link (USL), Smart Region of Interest (SROI), End-of-Transmission Short Packet (EoTp) and support for RAW-24 color depth.

The most recent version, CSI-2 v4.2, was released in December 2025.

=== CSI-3 ===
MIPI CSI-3 is a high-speed, bidirectional protocol primarily intended for image and video transmission between cameras and hosts within a multi-layered, peer-to-peer, UniPro-based M-PHY device network. It was originally released in 2012 and got re-released in version 1.1 in March 2014.

=== CCS ===
The Camera Command Set (CCS) v1.0 specification was released on November 30, 2017. CCS defines a standard set of functionalities for controlling image sensors using CSI-2.

The most recent version, CCS v1.1.1, was released in April 2023.

== Technology and speeds ==
For electromagnetic interference reasons the system designer can select between two different clock rates (a and b) in each of the M-PHY speed levels.

M-PHY speed	Clock rate	Bit rate
Gear 1	G1a	1.25 Gbit/s
Gear 1	G1b	1.49 Gbit/s
Gear 2	G2a	2.5 Gbit/s
Gear 2	G2b	2.9 Gbit/s
Gear 3	G3a	5 Gbit/s
Gear 3	G3b	5.8 Gbit/s

== See also ==
- Display Serial Interface
- Camera Link
- USB video device class
