= Ray Zinn =

American inventor, entrepreneur and author (born 1937)

Raymond D "Ray" Zinn
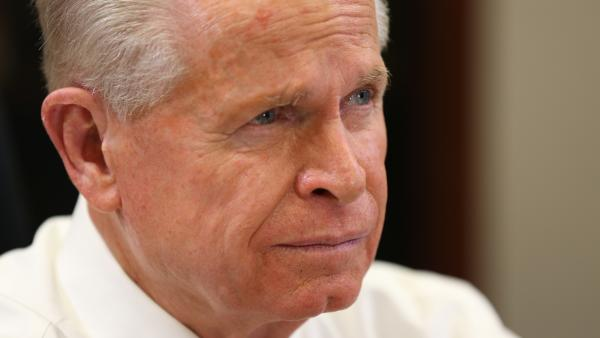
- Born: September 24, 1937 (age 88); El Centro, California
- Occupations: Co-founder, chair, chief executive officer and president, Micrel Corporation (acquired in 2015 by Microchip Technology)
- Website: http://www.ToughThingsFirst.com

Raymond D. "Ray" Zinn (born in El Centro, California on September 24, 1937) is an inventor, entrepreneur and author. In addition to a number of significant inventions improving wireless radio (RF) communication and voltage/power regulation devices, he is also the longest serving chief executive officer of a Silicon Valley company (Micrel Corporation, acquired in 2015 by Microchip Technology).

== Early life ==
Zinn was born on September 24, 1937, to Milton and Pauline Zinn, and grew up on a cattle ranch in the farming community of El Centro, California. The eldest of 11 children, including six sisters and four brothers, Zinn was raised a member of the Church of Jesus Christ of Latter Day Saints, and a strong work ethic was instilled at an early age by his parents. When he was four, his mother sent him to the store to lug home heavy bottles of milk. He had a driver's license at 13 to chauffeur his siblings in a Ford pickup and work with water management officials in the dead of night to assure the family ranch received their allocation. "Work becomes instilled in you from an early age. So if somebody asks me how 'success' is spelled, I tell them it's spelled W-O-R-K."

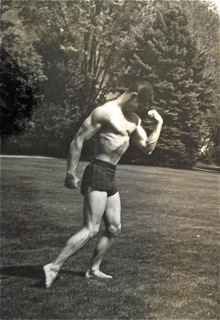
Ray Zinn, high school, gymnastics pose

Throughout his high school and college years, Zinn was an accomplished gymnast, hurdler and member of the track and field team.

During his junior year in college, he told his father he was quitting school and his father locked him naked, wrapped in a paper towel diaper, in the ranch office restroom for six hours. Zinn's father was giving his son a lesson about what it meant to cut short his education. "He was saying, 'Well, if you're going to quit school, you're going out in the world the way you came in.' He wanted me to think about living with decisions," Zinn said. Ray Zinn changed his mind and finished college.

He graduated from Brigham Young University in 1960 with a BS in Industrial Management, and an MS in Business Administration from San Jose State University in 1968.

== Early career ==
After college, Zinn moved to the San Francisco Bay area, where high-tech companies were gaining traction. His interest in the space program and the desire to become an astronaut landed him a position at rocket motor manufacturing, United Technologies. Later, Zinn became interested in semiconductors through his father-in-law, who worked at Fairchild Semiconductor Corporation and joined the company as an engineer in 1963.

He left Fairchild in 1968 and subsequently held various executive management positions at several semiconductor-related companies, including Teledyne, Inc. (1966–69), Nortek Inc. (1971–73) and Electromask TRE (1973–76). During this period, and later through Micrel, Zinn worked nearly every aspect of semiconductor management; sales, marketing, finance, accounting, wafer fab operations, assembly, packaging, test, quality assurance, and design.

While working as a sales representative at Electromask, Zinn conceptualized the Wafer Stepper and sold it, before it had been designed or engineered, to Texas Instruments. According to Zinn, this unauthorized selling of equipment that had not yet been designed caused his boss at Electromask to tell him "You really shouldn’t work for anybody else." Due to Electromask's partnership with IBM and that company's commitment to e-beam technology, Electromask never sought or acquired the patents for the Wafer Stepper.

== Micrel ==
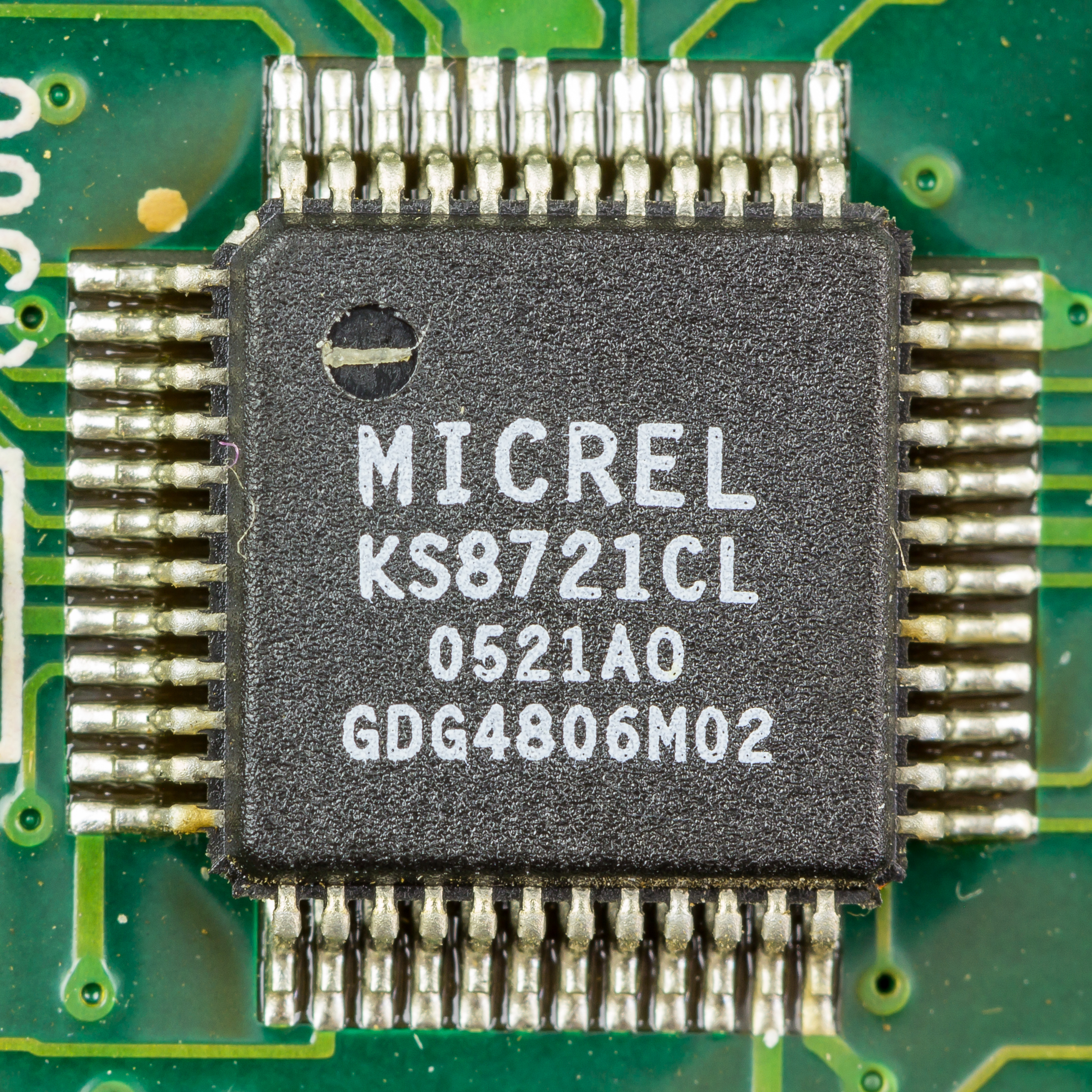
Micrel KS8721CL – 3.3V Single Power Supply 10/100BASE-TX/FX MII Physical Layer Transceiver

Along with his friend Warren Muller, Zinn founded the semiconductor company Micrel in 1978. The pair used $300,000 in savings and bank loans to found the company, eschewing the financial support of venture capitalists. "I wanted control of my destiny and to do it my way." Zinn's desire to remain independent led him at one time to personally guarantee $4 million in bank loans to keep Micrel afloat.

Under Zinn's leadership, Micrel was profitable in its first year, and for 36 of its 37 years. Zinn credits this success to the company's disciplined focus on profitability. Micrel was also credited with having the lowest employee turn-over in the semiconductor industry and, though it is an unofficial measure, the highest "boomerang" employee rate, the rate at which employees who leave the company return.

During an investor "roadshow" promoting Micrel's initial public offering in London, England, Zinn suffered a retinal vein occlusion which reduced his vision to 20/400, making Zinn legally blind. Zinn resisted turning control of Micrel over to another CEO. Instead, Zinn took advantage of every technology he could to compensate for his limited eyesight. Zinn continued to lead Micrel for another 20 years.

Zinn established a unique corporate culture at Micrel, which included unusual guidelines such as his "no swearing" policy. Swearing or using condescending language at the company was banned. Workers were also urged to be honest, show integrity and respect others at the company. "We believe that work should be an extension of the home." Micrel's humanistic corporate culture has been referred "an almost spiritual approach to doing business."

Micrel was sold to Microchip Technology in 2015. Zinn was profiled in Sand Hill's leadership series because of the leadership ability demonstrated throughout his tenure as founder and CEO of Micrel.

=== Key dates ===
- 1978 Micrel is founded.
- 1981 Micrel acquires a fabrication facility.
- 1994 Micrel completes its initial public offering of stock.
- 2002 A$41 million loss halts 22 years of consecutive profits.
- 2015 Micrel sold to Microchip.

== Inventions and patents ==
One of Zinn's most significant inventions includes a method allowing radio devices to operate without the need to synchronize a receiver with a transmitter. Using frequency hopping and sweep modes, this method is primarily applied in low data rate wireless applications such as utility metering, machine and equipment monitoring and metering, and remote control. In 2006 Zinn received U.S. patent 6,996,399 for his "Wireless device and method using frequency hopping and sweep modes."

Zinn also invented a method to quickly encode and/or decode RF signals. This technology forms the core of a number of devices, including (but not limited to) garage door openers and accompanying remote access; security or alarm systems and a remote access to activate and deactivate the security system; and low power, two-way radio communication devices.

=== Other inventions ===
- A transmitter power level optimization and error correction technique for battery-operated RF transceivers which adjust the transmit power in transceivers to an optimal level to conserve battery life.
- Voltage regulators (including voltage regulators having pulse-width modulation or PWM and a low drop out or LDO modes) as well as a hybrid voltage regulator containing a switching regulator and a linear regulator for converting an unregulated voltage, such as a battery voltage, to a regulated DC voltage of a desired value.

Zinn is also accredited with the development of the analog control of a digital decision process, an achievement he shares with Peter Chambers and Scott Brown; a pulse frequency modulated voltage regulator with linear regulator control (in collaboration with Charles L. Vinn), as well as:

- An apparatus for converting voltage with regulator
- A circuit having trim pads formed in scribe channel, and
- A voltage regulation system

== Authorship ==
In 2015, Zinn wrote Tough Things First (Published by McGraw Hill Education), in which he distilled his knowledge of leadership and management. Tough Things First is an autobiographical treatise on the interaction of people, management, and leadership, Self-discipline and organization discipline, and the mechanics of enterprises.

In 2018, Zinn wrote Zen of Zinn, in which he discusses the interrelationships of people, society, entrepreneurship, business, leadership and life

== Critical response to works ==
T.J. Rodgers, president & CEO, Cypress Semiconductor Corp "Tough Things First is not a typical business book about a market success or effective business methods. It is about the success of one Silicon Valley startup company, Micrel, which has been run profitably by the same CEO/founder for 36 years. It is about how a founder's dedication to basic principles is required to make any startup successful. The precise recipe for success may change—for example, my 32-year-old company, Cypress Semiconductor, used venture funding, while Zinn preached and achieved financial independence—but Zinn shows how startups must have and truly practice their core values to succeed."

Greg McKeown, author of the New York Times bestseller Essentialism: The Disciplined Pursuit of Less. "The disciplined pursuit of what is essential is ten times harder than the undisciplined pursuit of the nonessential but it is a hundred times more valuable. This is brilliantly illustrated in Tough Things First."

Reed Wilcox, president of Southern Virginia University said of Tough Things First "Many business self-help books are by experts who study and talk to the people who actually do it, but have not lived it themselves. It's not in their blood. This is very different. I have not seen a better, more practical, more realistic, more helpful, or more engaging invitation to entrepreneurship."

== China ==
Zinn has been a vocal advocate of disengaging the technology industry from China. He coined the phrase "Chinexit" to describe the act of moving business operations out of China. Zinn has stated that "Unimpeded, China will control major parts of the entire electronics supply chain and, in effect, control much of the world." Zinn's company, Micrel, was notable in the semiconductor industry for not having fabrication facilities in China.
