= Display pixel interface =

The Display pixel interface (DPI) is the interface defined by the Mobile Industry Processor Interface (MIPI), which is used for Active-Matrix LCD displays for handheld devices. It is intended for the display modules in the mobile devices.
