= System Power Management Interface =

The System Power Management Interface (SPMI) is a high-speed, low-latency, bi-directional, two-wire serial bus suitable for real-time control of voltage and frequency scaled multi-core application processors and its power management of auxiliary components. SPMI obsoletes a number of legacy, custom point-to-point interfaces and provides a low pin count, high-speed control bus for up to 4 master and 16 slave devices. SPMI is specified by the MIPI Alliance (Mobile Industry Process Interface Alliance).
