= MIPI Alliance =

Global business alliance

- Type: Trade association
- Industry: Mobile and mobile-influenced devices
- Founded: 2003
- Headquarters: United States
- Number of locations: Global
- Website: www.mipi.org

MIPI Alliance is a global business alliance that develops technical specifications for the mobile ecosystem, particularly smart phones but including mobile-influenced industries. MIPI was founded in 2003 by Arm, Nokia, STMicroelectronics and Texas Instruments.

Non-member organizations have limited access to MIPI standards, with some exceptions. The exceptions generally take the form of a public version of the standard. An example of one of these exceptions is the I3C Basic standard which requires no license from MIPI to implement.

The organization comprises about 330 member companies worldwide, 15 active working groups and has delivered more than 45 specifications within the mobile ecosystem in the last decade. MIPI specifications provide interface solutions for mobile handsets. As the traditional mobile ecosystem has expanded to include tablets and laptops, MIPI Alliance's specifications are implemented beyond mobile phones including: tablets, PCs, cameras, industrial electronics, Machine to Machine (IoT), augmented reality, automotive, and medical technologies.

MIPI members include handset manufacturers, device OEMs, software providers, semiconductor companies, application processor developers, IP tool providers, test and test equipment companies, as well as camera, tablet and laptop manufacturers.

== Organizational structure ==
MIPI (for Mobile Industry Processor Interface) is a non-profit corporation governed by a board of directors. The Officers of MIPI Alliance include the chairman, vice chairman, secretary, and treasurer. The board manages the general affairs of the organization, acting in the interest of its members in the development of specifications which advance interface technology for mobile devices. The board receives technical direction from a technical steering group.

The board approves and directs working groups to evaluate or develop specifications to meet a specific interface requirement.

The marketing working group is responsible for developing and executing activities that promote the MIPI specifications.

Birds of a feather (BIF) and investigation groups may be formed by the board to evaluate and consider new technology or market trends which could benefit from the development of an interface specification.

== MIPI Alliance working groups ==
MIPI Alliance working groups are created and structured to define common mobile-interface specifications. The organization currently has more than 15 working groups, spanning mobile device design. Each working group progresses along a standard path - from investigation group to specification. Led by a technical chair, group members define the requirements for the specification, solicit input and proposals, discuss, and create a draft specification. From there, the specification is vetted and reviewed by the board of directors. After a final vote, the draft becomes a specification which is made available to all member companies. Only MIPI members have access to the complete published specification. Working Group participation is open to board, promoter, and contributor member companies. While adopter members do not participate in working groups, they do have access to the published specifications.

Current working groups include:

- Analog Control Interface
- Battery Interface (MIPI BIF; a kind of smart battery interface)
- Camera (Camera Serial Interface)
- Debug
- DigRF
- Display (Display Serial Interface)
- High Speed Synchronous Interface
- Low Latency Interface
- Low Speed Multipoint Link (SLIMbus)
- Marketing
- PHY
- Reduced Input/Output Working Group (RIO)
- RF Front-End Working Group (RFFE)
- Sensor Work Group (I3C)
- Software Investigation Group
- Technical Steering Group
- Test Working Group
- UniPro, including M-PHY, used by Mobile PCIe

== Specifications ==
MIPI specifications address only the interface technology, such as signaling characteristics and protocols; they do not standardize entire application processors or peripherals. Products which utilize MIPI specs will retain many differentiating features. By enabling products which share common MIPI interfaces, system integration is likely to be less burdensome than in the past.

MIPI is agnostic to air interface or wireless telecommunication standards. Because MIPI specifications address only the interface requirements of application processor and peripherals, MIPI compliant products are applicable to all network technologies, including GSM, CDMA2000, WCDMA, PHS, TD-SCDMA, and others.

Some of the specifications by MIPI include:

- Camera Serial Interface
- Discovery and Configuration (DisCo)
- Display Serial Interface
- Display pixel interface
- System Power Management Interface (SPMI)
- SoundWire, introduced in 2014
- MIPI I3C sensor interface standard
- MIPI Battery Interface (BIF)
- MIPI Debug Architecture

== Membership categories ==
MIPI membership categories include:

- Adopters can use MIPI specifications to develop MIPI compliant products, and receive licenses to do so. Any company may apply for adopter level membership.
- Contributors have all rights of adopters, plus the opportunity to define MIPI specifications by participating in the working groups.
- Promoters are elected by the board from the set of contributors. Each promoter has all rights of a contributor, plus a voting board seat.
- Founders have all rights of a promoter and a permanent board seat.

== MIPI partner organizations ==
- JEDEC
- MEMS Industry Group
- PCI-SIG
- USB Implementers Forum
- VESA
