= Direct memory access =

Feature of computer systems

Direct memory access (DMA) is a feature of many computer systems that allows certain hardware subsystems to access main system memory independently of the central processing unit (CPU).

Without DMA, programmed input–output must be used to transfer data which typically fully occupies the CPU for the entire duration of the transfer, and is thus unavailable to perform other work. With DMA, the CPU first initiates the transfer, then it does other operations while the transfer is in progress, and it finally receives an interrupt from the direct memory access controller (DMAC) when the operation is done. This feature is useful at any time that the CPU cannot keep up with the rate of data transfer, or when the CPU needs to perform work while waiting for a relatively slow data transfer.

Many hardware systems use DMA, including disk drive controllers, graphics cards, network cards, sound cards and dedicated DMA controllers (acting on behalf of the aforementioned device types). DMA is also used for intra-chip data transfer in some multi-core processors. Computers that have DMA capability can transfer data to and from devices with much less CPU overhead than computers without DMA.

DMA can also be used for memory-to-memory transfers. DMA can offload expensive memory operations, such as large copies or scatter-gather operations, from the CPU to a DMA controller. An implementation example is the I/O Acceleration Technology. DMA is of interest in network-on-chip and in-memory computing architectures.

While hardware acceleration is usually vendor-specific, direct memory access can be used by the class driver.

== Principles ==
=== Third-party ===
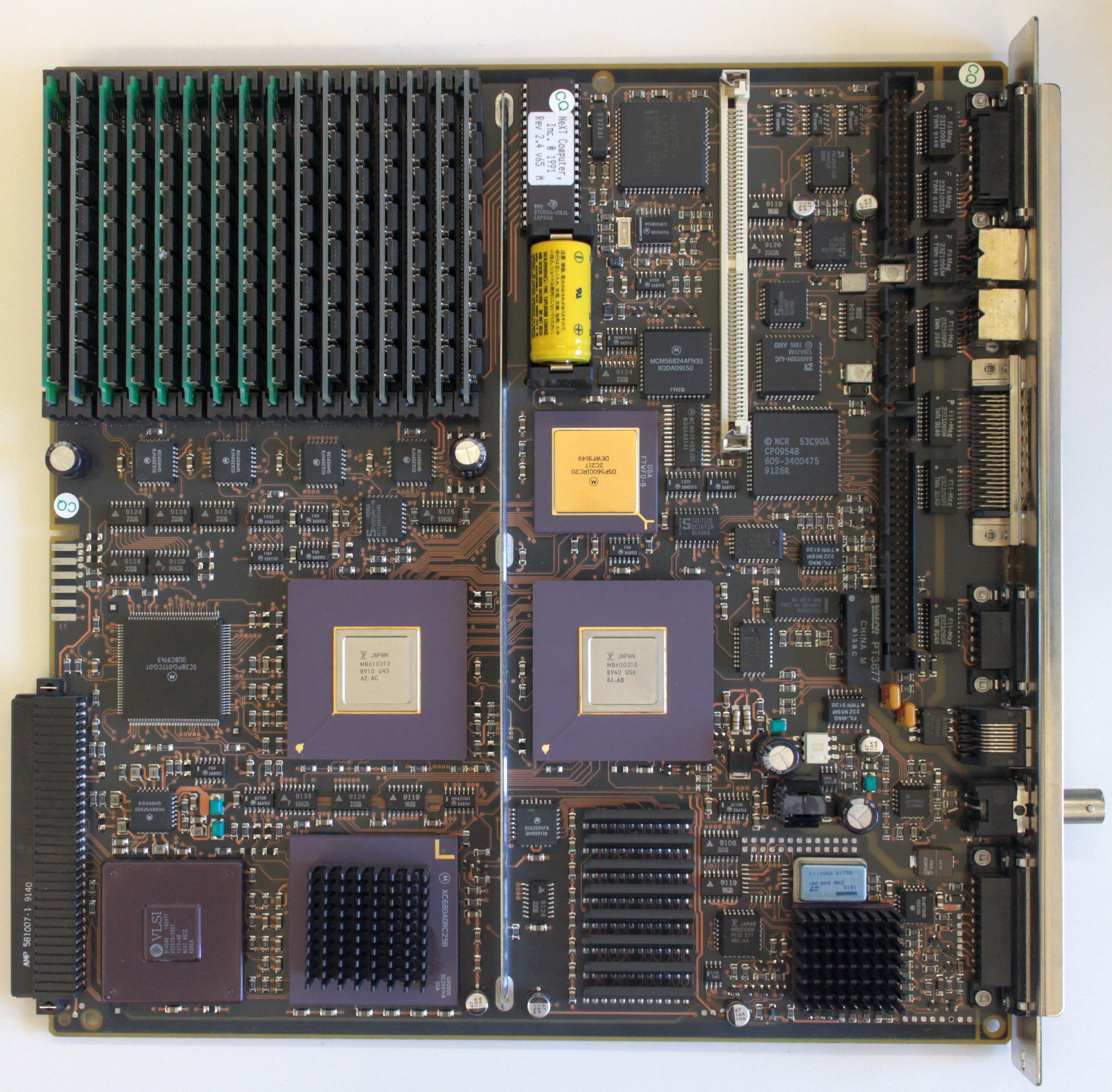
Motherboard of a NeXTcube computer (1990). The two large integrated circuits below the middle of the image are the DMA controller (left) and - unusual - an extra dedicated DMA controller (right) for the magneto-optical disc used instead of a hard disk drive in the first series of this computer model.

Standard DMA, also called third-party DMA, uses a DMA controller. A DMA controller can generate memory addresses and initiate memory read or write cycles. It contains several hardware registers that can be written and read by the CPU. These include a memory address register, a count register, and one or more control registers. Depending on what features the DMA controller provides, these control registers might specify some combination of the source, the destination, the direction of the transfer (reading from the I/O device or writing to the I/O device).

To carry out an input, output or memory-to-memory operation, the host processor initializes the DMA controller with a count of the number of words to transfer, and the memory address to use. The CPU then commands the peripheral device to initiate a data transfer. The DMA controller then provides addresses and read/write control lines to the system memory. Each time a byte of data is ready to be transferred between the peripheral device and memory, the DMA controller increments its internal address register until the full block of data is transferred.

=== Bus mastering ===
In a bus mastering system, also known as a first-party DMA system, the CPU and peripherals can each be granted control of the memory bus. Where a peripheral can become a bus master, it can directly write to system memory without the involvement of the CPU, providing memory address and control signals as required. Some measures must be provided to put the processor into a hold condition so that bus contention does not occur. The peripheral itself may have hardware registers, such as address and count registers, to control the DMA operation.

== Modes of operation ==
=== Burst mode ===
In burst mode, an entire block of data is transferred in one contiguous sequence. Once the DMA controller is granted access to the system bus by the CPU, it transfers all bytes of data in the data block before releasing control of the system bus back to the CPU. This renders the CPU inactive for relatively long periods of time. The mode is also called block transfer mode.

=== Cycle stealing mode ===
The cycle stealing mode is used in systems in which the CPU should not be disabled for the length of time needed for burst transfer modes. In the cycle stealing mode, the DMA controller obtains access to the system bus the same way as in burst mode, using BR (Bus Request) and BG (Bus Grant) signals, which are the two signals controlling the interface between the CPU and the DMA controller. However, in cycle-stealing mode, after one unit of data transfer, the control of the system bus is deasserted to the CPU via BG. It is then continually requested again via BR, transferring one unit of data per request, until the entire block of data has been transferred. By continually obtaining and releasing the control of the system bus, the DMA controller essentially interleaves data transfers with CPU activity. The CPU processes an instruction, then the DMA controller transfers one data value, and so on. Data is not transferred as quickly, but the CPU is not idled for as long as in burst mode.

=== Transparent mode ===
Transparent mode (also called Hidden DMA data transfer mode) is the most efficient mode in terms of overall system performance. In transparent mode, the DMA controller transfers data only when the CPU is performing operations that do not use the system buses. The primary advantage of transparent mode is that the CPU never stops executing its programs, while the disadvantages are that DMA transfers are not prioritized and the hardware needs to predict when the CPU does not intend to use the system buses.

== Cache coherency ==

DMA transfers can produce cache coherency problems. Imagine a CPU equipped with a cache and an external memory that can be accessed directly by devices using DMA. When the CPU accesses a location in external memory, the current value will be stored in the cache. Subsequent CPU modifications will update the cached copy, but not the external memory version, assuming a write-back cache. If the CPU cache is not flushed to memory before the next time a DMA read transfer accesses one of these CPU-modified locations, the DMA-connected device will receive a stale value.

Similarly, if the cached copy of X is not invalidated when a DMA transfer writes a new value to the memory, then the CPU will operate on a stale value.

This issue can be addressed in one of two ways in system design: Cache-coherent systems implement a method in hardware, called bus snooping, whereby external writes are signaled to the cache controller which then performs a cache invalidation for DMA writes or cache flush for DMA reads. Non-coherent systems leave this to software, where the OS must then ensure that the cache lines are flushed before an outgoing DMA transfer is started and invalidated before a memory range affected by an incoming DMA transfer is accessed. The OS must make sure that the memory range is not accessed by any running threads in the meantime. The latter approach introduces some overhead to the DMA operation, as most hardware requires a loop to invalidate each cache line individually.

Hybrids also exist, where the secondary L2 cache is coherent while the L1 cache (typically on-CPU) is managed by software.

== Examples ==
=== ISA ===
In the original IBM PC (and the follow-up PC/XT), there was only one Intel 8237 DMA controller capable of providing four DMA channels (numbered 0–3). These DMA channels performed 8-bit transfers (as the 8237 was an 8-bit device, ideally matched to the PC's i8088 CPU/bus architecture), could only address the first (i8086/8088-standard) megabyte of RAM, and were limited to addressing single 64 kB segments within that space (although the source and destination channels could address different segments). Additionally, the controller could only be used for transfers to, from or between expansion bus I/O devices, as the 8237 could only perform memory-to-memory transfers using channels 0 & 1, of which channel 0 in the PC (& XT) was dedicated to dynamic memory refresh. This prevented it from being used as a general-purpose "Blitter", and consequently, block memory moves in the PC, limited by the general PIO speed of the CPU, were very slow.

With the IBM PC/AT, the enhanced AT bus (more familiarly retronymed as the Industry Standard Architecture (ISA)) added a second 8237 DMA controller to provide three additional, and as highlighted by resource clashes with the XT's additional expandability over the original PC, much-needed channels (5–7; channel 4 is used as a cascade to the first 8237). ISA DMA's extended 24-bit address bus width allows it to access up to 16 MB of lower memory. The page register was also rewired to address the full 16 MB memory address space of the 80286 CPU. This second controller was also integrated in a way capable of performing 16-bit transfers when an I/O device is used as the data source and/or destination (as it actually only processes data itself for memory-to-memory transfers, otherwise simply controlling the data flow between other parts of the 16-bit system, making its own data bus width relatively immaterial), doubling data throughput when the upper three channels are used.

For compatibility, the lower four DMA channels were still limited to 8-bit transfers only, and whilst memory-to-memory transfers were now technically possible due to the freeing up of channel 0 from having to handle DRAM refresh, from a practical standpoint they were of limited value because of the controller's consequent low throughput compared to what the CPU could now achieve (i.e., a 16-bit, more optimised 80286 running at a minimum of 6 MHz, vs an 8-bit controller locked at 4.77 MHz). In both cases, the 64 kB segment boundary issue remained, with individual transfers unable to cross segments (instead "wrapping around" to the start of the same segment) even in 16-bit mode, although this was in practice more a problem of programming complexity than performance as the continued need for DRAM refresh (however handled) to monopolise the bus approximately every 15 μs prevented use of large (and fast, but uninterruptible) block transfers.

Due to their lagging performance (1.6 MB/s maximum 8-bit transfer capability at 5 MHz, but no more than 0.9 MB/s in the PC/XT and 1.6 MB/s for 16-bit transfers in the AT due to ISA bus overheads and other interference such as memory refresh interruptions) and unavailability of any speed grades that would allow installation of direct replacements operating at speeds higher than the original PC's standard 4.77 MHz clock, these devices have been effectively obsolete since the late 1980s.

==== 80386 and 32-bit systems ====
Particularly, the advent of the 80386 processor in 1985 and its capacity for 32-bit transfers (although great improvements in the efficiency of address calculation and block memory moves in Intel CPUs after the 80186 meant that PIO transfers even by the 16-bit-bus 286 and 386SX could still easily outstrip the 8237), as well as the development of further evolutions to (EISA) or replacements for (MCA, VLB and PCI) the "ISA" bus with their own much higher-performance DMA subsystems (up to a maximum of 33 MB/s for EISA, 40 MB/s MCA, typically 13 MB/s VLB/PCI) made the original DMA controllers seem more of a performance millstone than a booster. They were supported to the extent that they are required to support built-in legacy PC hardware on later machines.

The pieces of legacy hardware that continued to use ISA DMA after 32-bit expansion buses became common were Sound Blaster cards that needed to maintain full hardware compatibility with the Sound Blaster standard; and Super I/O devices on motherboards that often integrated a built-in floppy disk controller, an IrDA infrared controller when FIR (fast infrared) mode is selected, and an IEEE 1284 parallel port controller when ECP mode is selected. In cases where an original 8237s or direct compatibles were still used, transfer to or from these devices may still be limited to the first 16 MB of main RAM regardless of the system's actual address space or amount of installed memory.

Each DMA channel has a 16-bit address register and a 16-bit count register associated with it. To initiate a data transfer, the device driver sets up the DMA channel's address and count registers together with the direction of the data transfer, read or write. It then instructs the DMA hardware to begin the transfer. When the transfer is complete, the device interrupts the CPU.

Scatter-gather or vectored I/O DMA allows the transfer of data to and from multiple memory areas in a single DMA transaction. It is equivalent to the chaining together of multiple simple DMA requests. The motivation is to offload multiple input/output interrupt and data copy tasks from the CPU.

DRQ stands for Data request; DACK for Data acknowledge. These symbols, seen on hardware schematics of computer systems with DMA functionality, represent electronic signaling lines between the CPU and DMA controller. Each DMA channel has one Request and one Acknowledge line. A device that uses DMA must be configured to use both lines of the assigned DMA channel.

16-bit ISA permitted bus mastering.

Standard ISA DMA assignments:

1. DRAM refresh (obsolete)
2. User hardware usually ISA sound card
3. Floppy disk controller
4. WDMA for hard disk controller (replaced by UDMA modes), parallel port (ECP capable port), or certain SoundBlaster Clones like the OPTi 928
5. 8237 DMA controller
6. Hard disk controller (PS/2 only), or user hardware, usually an ISA sound card
7. User hardware
8. User hardware

=== PCI ===
A PCI architecture has no central DMA controller, unlike ISA. Instead, A PCI device can request control of the bus ("become the bus master") and request to read from and write to system memory. More precisely, a PCI component requests bus ownership from the PCI bus controller (usually PCI host bridge, and PCI to PCI bridge), which will arbitrate if several devices request bus ownership simultaneously, since there can only be one bus master at one time. When the component is granted ownership, it will issue normal read and write commands on the PCI bus, which will be claimed by the PCI bus controller.

As an example, on an Intel Core-based PC, the southbridge will forward the transactions to the memory controller (which is integrated on the CPU die) using DMI, which will in turn convert them to DDR operations and send them out on the memory bus. As a result, there are quite a number of steps involved in a PCI DMA transfer; however, that poses little problem, since the PCI device or PCI bus itself are an order of magnitude slower than the rest of the components (see list of device bandwidths).

A modern x86 CPU may use more than 4 GB of memory, either utilizing the native 64-bit mode of x86-64 CPU, or the Physical Address Extension (PAE), a 36-bit addressing mode. In such a case, a device using DMA with a 32-bit address bus is unable to address memory above the 4 GB line. The new Double Address Cycle (DAC) mechanism, if implemented on both the PCI bus and the device itself, enables 64-bit DMA addressing. Otherwise, the operating system would need to work around the problem by either using costly double buffers (DOS/Windows nomenclature) also known as bounce buffers (FreeBSD/Linux), or it could use an IOMMU to provide address translation services if one is present.

=== I/OAT ===
As an example of DMA engine incorporated in a general-purpose CPU, some Intel Xeon chipsets include a DMA engine called I/O Acceleration Technology (I/OAT), which can offload memory copying from the main CPU, freeing it to do other work. In 2006, Intel's Linux kernel developer Andrew Grover performed benchmarks using I/OAT to offload network traffic copies and found no more than 10% improvement in CPU utilization with receiving workloads.

=== DDIO ===
Further performance-oriented enhancements to the DMA mechanism have been introduced in Intel Xeon E5 processors with their Data Direct I/O (DDIO) feature, allowing the DMA "windows" to reside within CPU caches instead of system RAM. As a result, CPU caches are used as the primary source and destination for I/O, allowing network interface controllers (NICs) to DMA directly to the last-level cache (L3 cache) of local CPUs and avoid costly fetching of the I/O data from system RAM. As a result, DDIO reduces the overall I/O processing latency, allows processing of the I/O to be performed entirely in cache, prevents the available RAM bandwidth/latency from becoming a performance bottleneck, and may lower the power consumption by allowing RAM to remain longer in a low-powered state.

=== AHB ===
In systems-on-a-chip and embedded systems, typical system bus infrastructure is a complex on-chip bus such as AMBA High-performance Bus. AMBA defines two kinds of AHB components: master and slave. A slave interface is similar to programmed I/O through which the software (running on an embedded CPU, e.g., ARM) can write/read I/O registers or (less commonly) local memory blocks inside the device. A master interface can be used by the device to perform DMA transactions to/from system memory without heavily loading the CPU.

Therefore, high bandwidth devices such as network controllers that need to transfer huge amounts of data to/from system memory will have two interface adapters to the AHB: a master and a slave interface. This is because on-chip buses like AHB do not support tri-stating the bus or alternating the direction of any line on the bus. Like PCI, no central DMA controller is required since the DMA is bus-mastering, but an arbiter is required in case of multiple masters present on the system.

Internally, a multichannel DMA engine is usually present in the device to perform multiple concurrent scatter-gather operations as programmed by the software.

=== Cell ===
As an example usage of DMA in a multiprocessor-system-on-chip, IBM/Sony/Toshiba's Cell processor incorporates a DMA engine for each of its 9 processing elements, including one Power processor element (PPE) and eight synergistic processor elements (SPEs). Since the SPE's load/store instructions can read/write only its own local memory, an SPE entirely depends on DMAs to transfer data to and from the main memory and local memories of other SPEs. Thus, the DMA acts as a primary means of data transfer among cores inside this CPU (in contrast to cache-coherent CMP architectures such as Intel's cancelled general-purpose GPU, Larrabee).

DMA in Cell is fully cache coherent (note, however, local stores of SPEs operated upon by DMA do not act as globally coherent cache in the standard sense). In both read ("get") and write ("put"), a DMA command can transfer either a single block area of size up to 16 KB, or a list of 2 to 2048 such blocks. The DMA command is issued by specifying a pair of a local address and a remote address: for example when a SPE program issues a put DMA command, it specifies an address of its own local memory as the source and a virtual memory address (pointing to either the main memory or the local memory of another SPE) as the target, together with a block size. According to an experiment, an effective peak performance of DMA in Cell (3 GHz, under uniform traffic) reaches 200 GB per second.

== DMA controller chips ==
- Intel 8257
- Am9517
- Intel 8237
- Z80 DMA
- LH0083, compatible to Z80 DMA
- μPD71037, capable of addressing a 64K-byte of memory
- μPD71071, capable of addressing a 16M-byte of memory

== Pipelining ==
Processors with scratchpad memory and DMA (such as digital signal processors and the Cell processor) may benefit from software overlapping DMA memory operations with processing, via double buffering or multibuffering. For example, the on-chip memory is split into two buffers; the processor may be operating on data in one, while the DMA engine is loading and storing data in the other. This allows the system to hide memory latency and exploit burst transfers, at the expense of needing a predictable memory access pattern.

== See also ==
- AT Attachment – Computer storage interface standard
- Autonomous peripheral operation – MCU hardware feature for task offloading
- Blitter – Integrated circuit for rapid data synchronization
- Channel I/O – High-performance input/output architecture
- DMA attack – Cyberattack exploiting high-speed expansion ports
- Memory-mapped I/O – Method of CPU communication
- Hardware acceleration – Specialized computer hardware
- In-memory processing – Processing data technology
- Memory management – Computer memory management methodology
- Network on a chip – Electronic communication subsystem on an integrated circuit
- Polling (computer science) – Process of device status sampling
- Remote direct memory access – Low-level hardware direct memory access
- UDMA – Data transfer method for ATA hard drives
- Virtual DMA Services

== Sources ==
- DMA Fundamentals on Various PC Platforms, from A. F. Harvey and Data Acquisition Division Staff NATIONAL INSTRUMENTS
- mmap() and DMA, from Linux Device Drivers, 2nd Edition, Alessandro Rubini & Jonathan Corbet
- Memory Mapping and DMA, from Linux Device Drivers, 3rd Edition, Jonathan Corbet, Alessandro Rubini, Greg Kroah-Hartman
- DMA and Interrupt Handling
- DMA Modes & Bus Mastering
