= Extended Industry Standard Architecture =

Bus standard for IBM PC compatible computers

EISA
- Enhanced Industry Standard Architecture
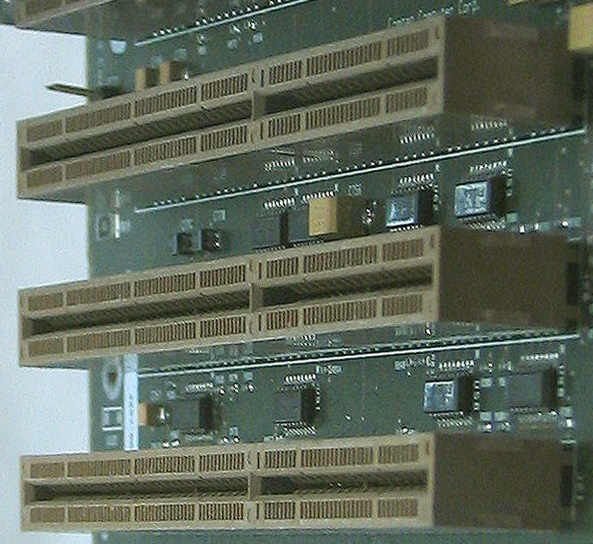
- Three EISA slots
- Year created: 1988; 38 years ago
- Created by: Gang of Nine
- Superseded by: PCI (1993)
- Width in bits: 32
- No. of devices: 1 per slot
- Speed: 8.33 MHz; Half-duplex 33 MB/s
- Style: Parallel
- Hotplugging interface: No
- External interface: No

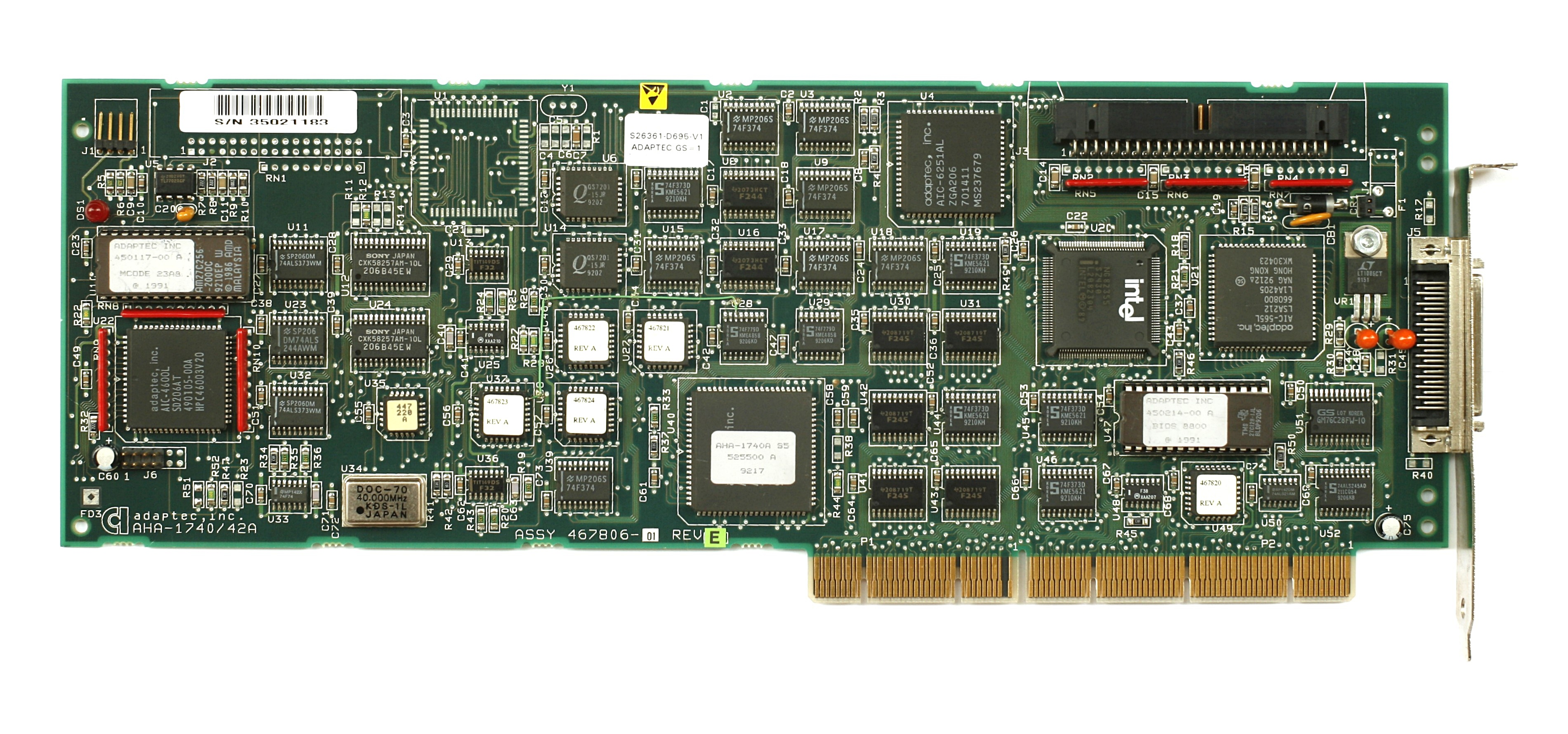
Adaptec AHA-1740, an EISA SCSI contoller

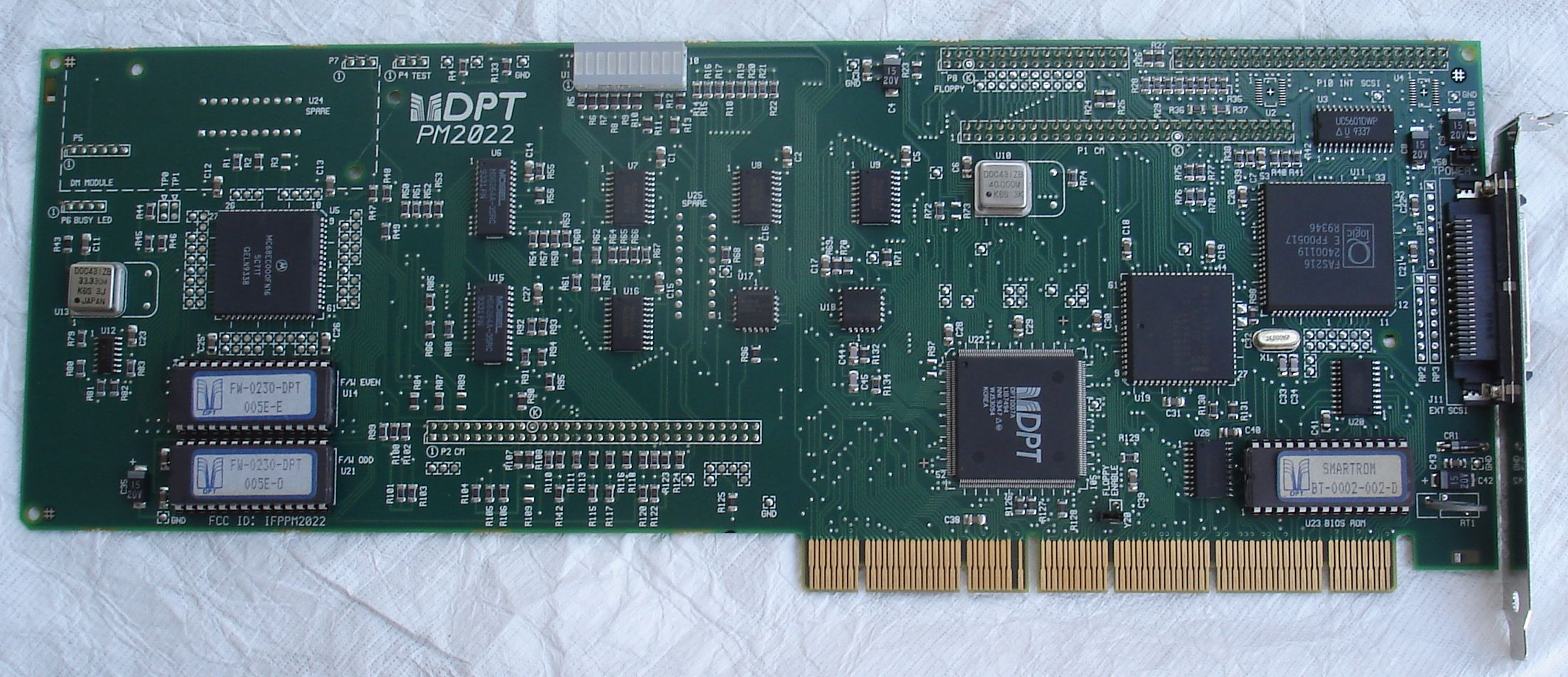
A Fast SCSI RAID controller. the DPT PM2022

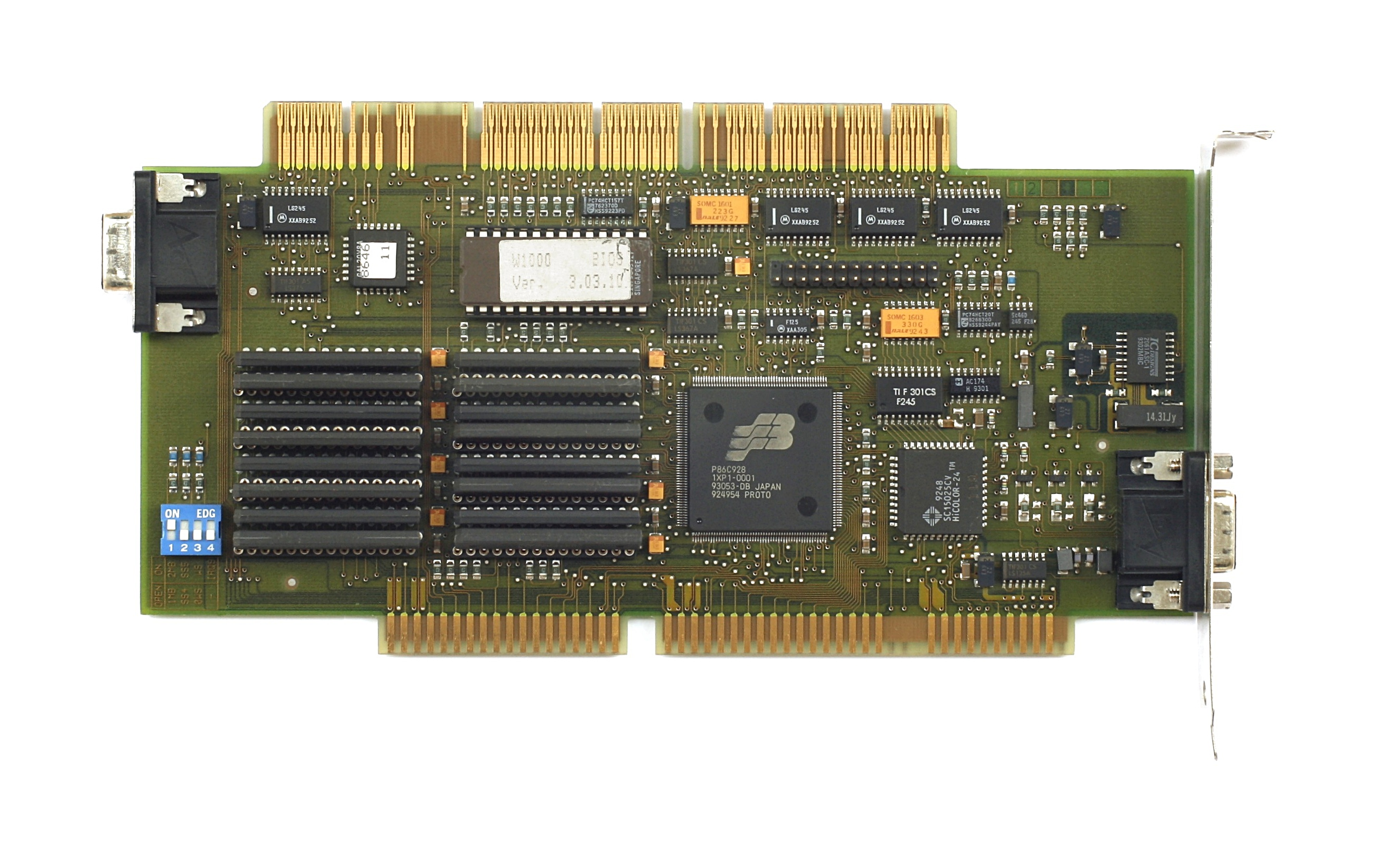
ELSA Winner 1000 Video card for ISA and EISA, using the S3 86c928 graphics proccesor

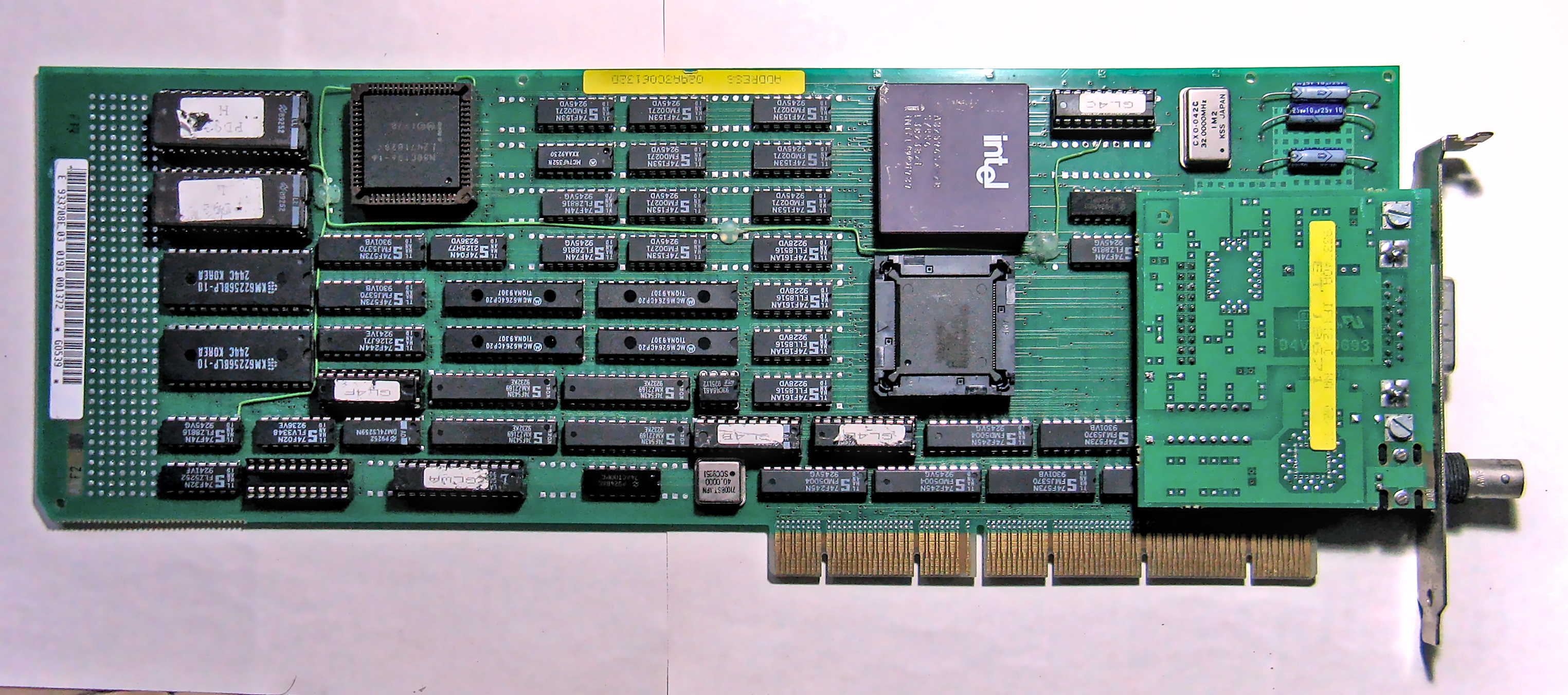
An EISA network card

The Extended Industry Standard Architecture (frequently known by the acronym EISA and pronounced "eee-suh") is a bus standard for IBM PC compatible computers. It was announced in September 1988 by a consortium of PC clone vendors (the Gang of Nine) as an alternative to IBM's proprietary Micro Channel architecture (MCA) in its PS/2 series.

In comparison with the AT bus, which the Gang of Nine retroactively renamed to the ISA bus to avoid infringing IBM's trademark on its PC/AT computer, EISA is extended to 32 bits and allows more than one CPU to share the bus. The bus mastering support is also enhanced to provide access to 4 GB of memory. Unlike MCA, EISA can accept older ISA cards – the lines and slots for EISA are a superset of ISA.

EISA was much favoured by manufacturers due to the proprietary nature of MCA, and even IBM produced some machines supporting it. It was somewhat expensive to implement (though not as much as MCA), so it never became particularly popular in desktop PCs. However, it was reasonably successful in the server market, as it was better suited to bandwidth-intensive tasks such as disk access or networking. Most EISA cards produced were either SCSI or NIC cards. EISA was also available on some non-IBM-compatible machines such as the DEC AlphaServer, HP 9000 D-class, SGI Indigo2 and MIPS Magnum.

By the time there was a strong market need for a bus of these speeds and capabilities for desktop computers, the VESA Local Bus and later PCI filled this niche, and EISA vanished into obscurity.

== History ==
The original IBM PC included five 8-bit slots, running at the system clock speed of 4.77 MHz. The PC/AT, introduced in 1984, had three 8-bit slots and five 16-bit slots, all running at the system clock speed of 6 MHz in the earlier models and 8 MHz in the last version of the computer. The 16-bit slots were a superset of the 8-bit configuration, so most 8-bit cards were able to plug into a 16-bit slot (some cards used a "skirt" design that physically interfered with the extended portion of the slot) and continue to run in 8-bit mode. One of the key reasons for the success of the IBM PC (and the PC clones that followed it) was the active ecosystem of third-party expansion cards available for the machines. IBM was restricted from patenting the bus and widely published the bus specifications.

As the PC-clone industry continued to build momentum in the mid- to late-1980s, several problems with the bus began to be apparent. First, because the "AT slot" (as it was known at the time) was not managed by any central standards group, there was nothing to prevent a manufacturer from "pushing" the standard. One of the most common issues was that as PC clones became more common, PC manufacturers began increasing the processor speed to maintain a competitive advantage. Unfortunately, because the ISA bus was originally locked to the processor clock, this meant that some 286 machines had ISA buses that ran at 10, 12, or even 16 MHz. In fact, the first systems to clock the ISA bus at 8 MHz were the turbo Intel 8088 clones that clocked the processors at 8 MHz. This caused many issues with incompatibility, where a true IBM-compatible third-party card (designed for an 8 MHz or 4.77 MHz bus) might not work reliably or at all in a higher-clocked system. Most PC makers eventually decoupled the bus clock from the system clock, but there was still no standards body to "police" the industry.

As companies like Dell modified the AT bus design, Phoenix Technologies in 1986 proposed a 32-bit extension to the AT bus in 1986, but leading clone vendor Compaq refused to cooperate. The AT architecture was so well entrenched that no single clone manufacturer had the leverage to create a standardized alternative, and there was no compelling reason for them to cooperate on a new standard. Because of this, when the first 386-based system (the Compaq Deskpro 386) was sold in 1986, it still supported 16-bit slots. Other 386 PCs followed suit, and the AT (later ISA) bus remained a part of most systems even into the late 1990s.

Meanwhile, IBM began to worry that it was losing control of the industry it had created. In 1987, IBM released the PS/2 line of computers, most of which included the MCA bus. MCA included numerous enhancements over the 16-bit AT bus, including bus mastering, burst mode, software-configurable resources, and 32-bit capabilities. However, in an effort to reassert its dominant role, IBM patented the bus and placed stringent licensing and royalty policies on its use. A few manufacturers did produce licensed MCA machines (most notably, NCR), but overall the industry balked at IBM's restrictions.

Steve Gibson proposed that clone makers adopt NuBus. After first stating that the AT bus was sufficient for customers, a group of companies led by Compaq (the Gang of Nine) developed a new bus instead. This new bus was named the Extended (or Enhanced) Industry Standard Architecture, or "EISA", while the older AT bus had already been renamed Industry Standard Architecture, or "ISA". This provided virtually all of the technical advantages of MCA, while remaining compatible with existing 8-bit and 16-bit cards, and (most enticing to system and card makers) minimal licensing cost.

Compaq developed EISA and persuaded others in the Gang of Nine to support it by licensing the technology for free. Just before announcing EISA, Compaq declined a last-minute offer by IBM to receive exclusive cooperation on MCA in return for abandoning EISA.

The EISA bus slot is a two-level staggered pin system, with the upper part of the slot corresponding to the standard ISA bus pin layout. The additional features of the EISA bus are implemented on the lower part of the slot connector, using thin traces inserted into the insulating gap of the upper / ISA card edge connector. Additionally, the lower part of the bus has five keying notches, so an ISA card with unusually long traces cannot accidentally extend down into the lower part of the slot.

One of the benefits to come out of the EISA standard was a final codification of the standard to which ISA slots and cards should be held (in particular, clock speed was fixed at an industry standard of 8.33 MHz). Thus, even systems that didn't use the EISA bus gained the advantage of having the ISA standardized, which contributed to its longevity.

== The Gang of Nine ==
The Gang of Nine was the informal name given to the consortium of personal computer manufacturing companies, led by Compaq, that announced the EISA bus. The nine companies together had more than 33% market share for all PCs in 1987, compared to IBM's 27%. The Gang of Nine had an even larger share of the market for 80386-based computers, with 43% compared to IBM's 16%. Compaq was among the first clone makers after the IBM PC's debut in 1981, and had 28% of the 80386 market. Rival members generally acknowledged Compaq's leadership, with one stating in 1989 that within the Gang of Nine "when you have 10 people sit down before a table to write a letter to the president, someone has to write the letter. Compaq is sitting down at the typewriter". The members were:

- AST Research, Inc.
- Compaq Computer Corporation
- Hewlett-Packard Company
- NEC Corporation
- Olivetti
- Seiko Epson Corporation
- Tandy Corporation
- WYSE
- Zenith Data Systems

== Technical data ==
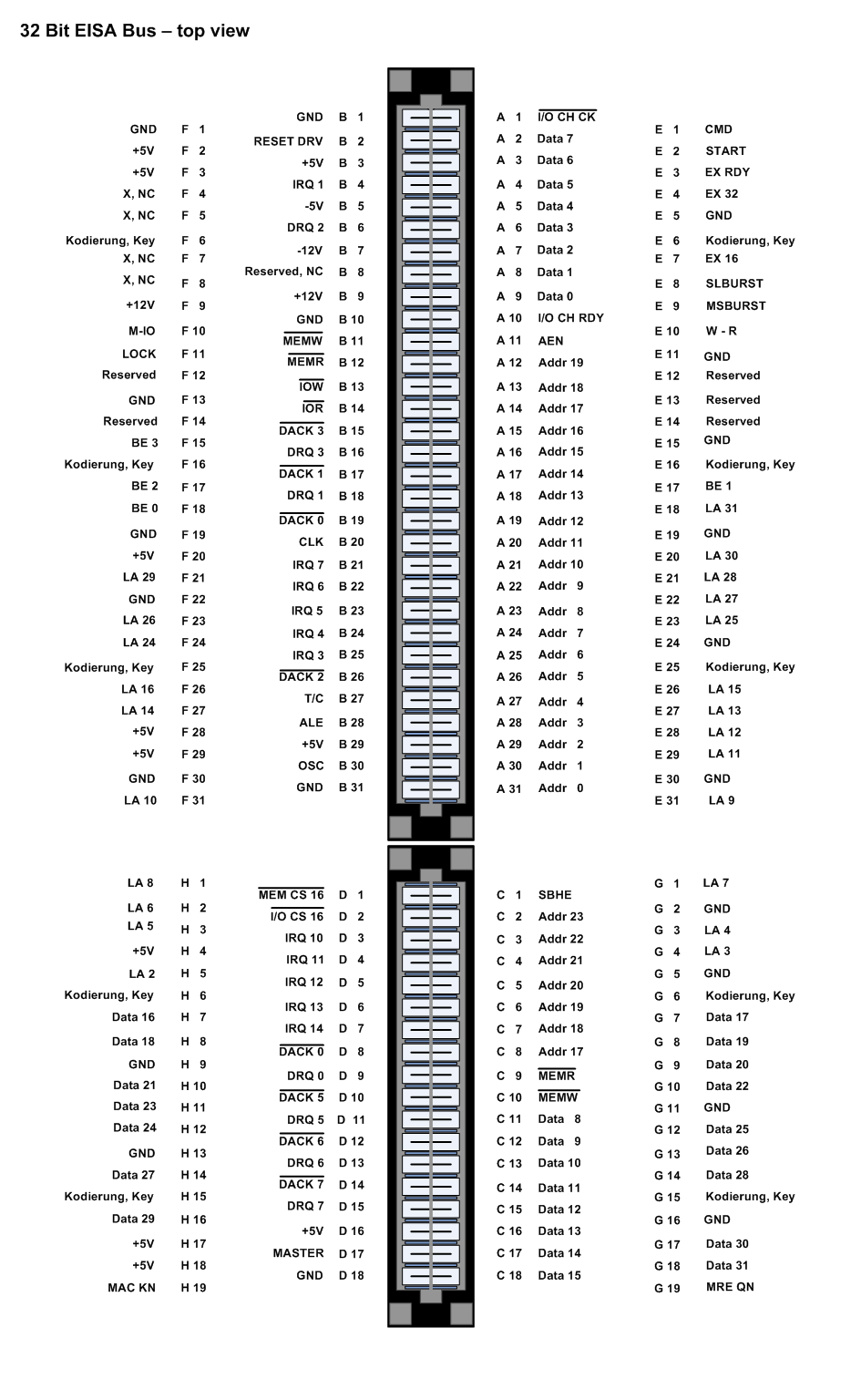
EISA pinout

Bus width	32 bits
Compatible with	8-bit ISA, 16-bit ISA
Pins	98 + 100 inlay
Vcc	+5 V, −5 V, +12 V, −12 V
Clock	8.33 MHz
Theoretical data rate (32-bit)	about 33 MB/s (8.33 MHz × 4 bytes)
Usable data rate (32-bit)	about 20 MB/s

Although the MCA bus had a slight performance advantage over EISA (bus speed of 10 MHz, compared to 8.33 MHz), EISA contained almost all of the technological benefits that MCA boasted, including bus mastering, burst mode, software-configurable resources, and 32-bit data/address buses. These brought EISA nearly to par with MCA from a performance standpoint, and EISA easily defeated MCA in industry support.

EISA replaced the tedious jumper configuration common with ISA cards with software-based configuration. Every EISA system shipped with an EISA configuration utility; this was usually a slightly customized version of the standard utilities written by the EISA chipset makers. The user would boot into this utility, either from floppy disk or on a dedicated hard-drive partition. The utility software would detect all EISA cards in the system and could configure any hardware resources (interrupts, memory ports, etc.) on any EISA card (each EISA card would include a disk with information that described the available options on the card) or on the EISA system motherboard. The user could also enter information about ISA cards in the system, allowing the utility to automatically reconfigure EISA cards to avoid resource conflicts.

The EISA had support for plug and play with special manufacturer drivers; however it was not widely used on desktop PCs.

The EISA had support for interrupt sharing, as well as 32-bit DMA.

Similarly, Windows 95, with its Plug-and-Play capability, was not able to change the configuration of EISA cards, but it could detect the cards, read their configuration, and reconfigure Plug-and-Play hardware to avoid resource conflicts. Windows 95 would also automatically attempt to install appropriate drivers for detected EISA cards.

== Industry acceptance ==
Intel introduced its first EISA chipset (and also their first chipset in the modern sense of the word) as the 82350 in September 1989. Intel introduced a lower-cost variant as the 82350DT, announced in April 1991; it began shipping in June of that year.

The first EISA computer announced was the HP Vectra 486 in October 1989. The first EISA computers to hit the market were the Compaq Deskpro 486 and the SystemPro. The SystemPro, being one of the first PC-style systems designed as a network server, was built from the ground up to take full advantage of the EISA bus. It included such features as multiprocessing, hardware RAID, and bus-mastering network cards.

Olivetti included EISA in its Olivetti NetStrada 7000 (CONDOR) product which embraced multiple bus architectures, its Adaptec RAID Controller occupied an EISA slot that could be accessed by up to 4 of its Pentium Pro 200 CPUs concurrently.

After not making it clear for its first year that the company would not license Micro Channel at all, IBM had lost market share because of slow PS/2 sales and customers' reluctance to use MCA. It debuted the AT bus-based PS/2 Model 30 286 in Manhattan at the same time as the EISA announcement elsewhere in the city, 17 months after telling customers that the AT bus was obsolete. Resentment of IBM's behavior contributed to the EISA coalition's formation.

The Gang of Nine's success with EISA was nonetheless uncertain. Some customers wished that a 32-bit bus had been available years earlier, and thought that IBM's rivals should now adopt MCA, for which almost 400 expansion cards were available by the time that EISA was introduced. Dell was a notable clone maker that did not join the Gang of Nine. A small number of other manufacturers, including Apricot, Dell, Research Machines, Tandy Corporation, and Olivetti adopted MCA, but only for part of their PC range. NCR Corporation adopted Micro Channel comprehensively - they designed and built high-performance personal computer, workstation and server platforms supporting it, including their own Micro Channel architecture-based logic componentry, including SCSI, graphics, networking, and audio.

Many manufacturers, including those in the Gang of Nine, researched the possibility of using MCA. For example, Compaq actually produced prototype DeskPro systems using the bus. However, these were never put into production, and when it was clear that MCA had lost, Compaq allowed its MCA license to expire (the license actually cost relatively little; the primary costs associated with MCA, and at which the industry revolted, were royalties to be paid per system shipped).

On the other hand, when it became clear to IBM that Micro Channel was dying, IBM actually licensed EISA for use in a few server systems. As a final jab at their competitor, Compaq (leader of the EISA consortium) didn't cash the first check sent by IBM for the EISA license. Instead, the check was framed and put on display in the company museum at Compaq's main campus in Houston, Texas.

EISA itself did not last a decade, being eventually superseded by PCI. However, EISA's legacy was the backwards-compatible standard that ensured that existing software and peripherals would continue to be compatible, as opposed to IBM's MCA bus which would have made these all obsolete. This backwards-compatibility trend for other technological achievements made possible the PC boom of the 1990s, followed by the worldwide adoption of the Internet, and eventually mobile computing in smartphones and tablets.

== See also ==
- Accelerated Graphics Port (AGP)
- Amiga Zorro II
- CompactPCI
- Industry Standard Architecture (ISA)
- List of device bandwidths
- Low Pin Count (LPC)
- Micro Channel architecture (MCA)
- Micro Channel Developers Association, consortium competing with the Gang of Nine
- MiniPCI
- NuBus
- PC Card
- PC/104
- PCI Express (PCIe)
- PCI-X
- Peripheral Component Interconnect (PCI)
- Silicon Cowboys, a 2016 documentary film about Compaq's role
- Universal Serial Bus
- VESA Local Bus (VLB)
