= Control bus =

Computer bus used by CPUs

In computer architecture, a control bus is part of the system bus and is used by CPUs for communicating with other devices within the computer. While the address bus carries the information about the device with which the CPU is communicating and the data bus carries the actual data being processed, the control bus carries commands from the CPU and returns status signals from the devices. For example, if the data is being read or written to the device the appropriate line (read or write) will be active (logic one).

== Lines ==
The number and type of lines in a control bus varies but there are basic lines common to all microprocessors, such as:

- Read ($\overline {RD}$). A single line that when active (logic zero) indicates the device is being read by the CPU.
- Write ($\overline {WR}$). A single line that when active (logic zero) indicates the device is being written by the CPU.
- Byte enable ($\overline E$). A group of lines that indicate the size of the data (8, 16, 32, 64 bytes).

The RD and WR signals of the control bus control the reading or writing of RAM, avoiding bus contention on the data bus.

Additional lines are microprocessor-dependent, such as:

- Transfer ACK ("acknowledgement"). Delivers information that the data was acknowledged (read) by the device.
- Bus request (BR, BREQ, or BRQ). Indicates a device is requesting the use of the (data) bus.
- Bus grant (BG or BGRT). Indicates the CPU has granted access to the bus.
- Interrupt request (IRQ). A device with lower priority is requesting access to the CPU.
- Clock signals. The signal on this line is used to synchronize data between the CPU and a device.
- Reset. If this line is active, the CPU will perform a hard reboot.

Systems that have more than one bus master have additional control bus signals that control which bus master drives the address bus, avoiding bus contention on the address bus.

== See also ==
- Address bus
- Data bus
- Bus mastering
