= HP Precision Bus =

Data transfer system of Unix

Bus scheme with optional interfaces

The HP Precision bus (also called HP-PB and HP-NIO) is the data transfer bus of the proprietary Hewlett Packard architecture HP 3000 and later many variants of the HP 9000 series of UNIX systems. This bus has a 32-bit data path with an 8 MHz clock. It supports a maximum transfer rate of 23 MB/s in burst mode. That bus was also used to directly support the Programmable Serial Interface (PSI) cards, which offered multi-protocol support for networking, notably IBM Bisync and similar systems.The 920, 922 and 932 series supported up to three PSI cards, and up to five cards in the 948 and 958 series.

Two form factors/sizes of HP-PB expansion cards were sold: single and double.

- 32-bit data path width
- 32 MB/s maximum data rate
- 8 MHz maximum frequency
- 5 V signalling voltage
- 96-pin (32×3) female pin+socket card connector (Is this a DIN 41612 connector?)
