= Asus Media Bus =

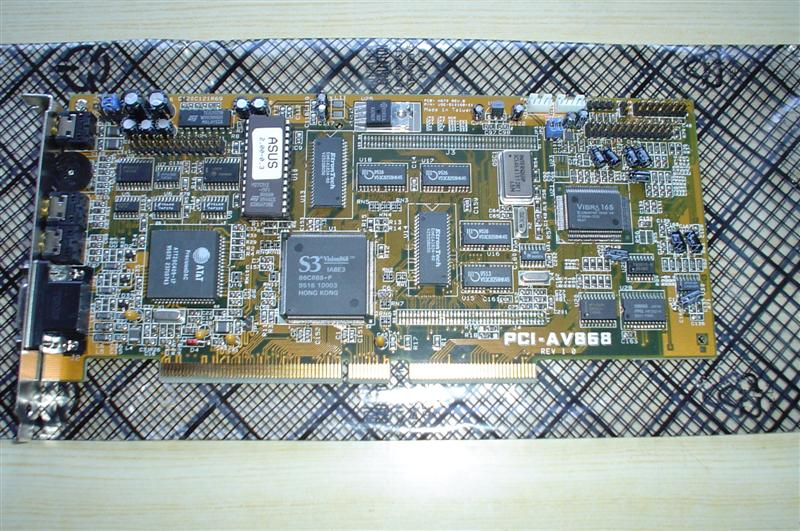
Asus Media BUS Graphic/Sound card PCI-AV868. Graphics runs over PCI, Sound runs over ISA

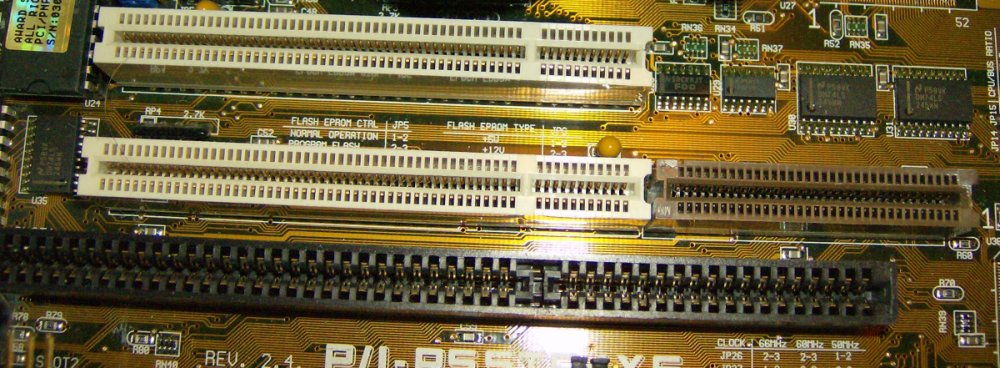
Asus Media Bus v1.2 slot (no space between sockets) on P55TP4XE

The Asus Media Bus is a proprietary computer bus developed by Asus, which was used on some Socket 7 motherboards in the middle 1990s. It is a combined PCI and ISA slot. It was developed to provide a cost-efficient solution to a complete multimedia system. Using Media Bus cards for building a system reduced slot requirements and compatibility problems. Expansion cards supporting this interface were only manufactured by Asus for a very limited time. This bus is now obsolete.

While similar to PCI-X in appearance, the extension contains four additional pins (two on each side) for a total of 68. The divider between the PCI slot and Media Bus extension is too wide to support a properly-keyed PCI-X card.

Despite the very short lifespan, there were at least two revisions of Asus Media Bus – revision 1.2 and 2.0. The difference between them is that the latter revision has 72 pins instead of 68 so it does not have to use any PCI slot signals reserved for PCI cards and PCI slot shared with the Media Bus slot becomes standards compliant. The gap between PCI slot and Media Bus extension is 0.32 in. for revision 1.2 (pictured) and 0.4 in. for revision 2.0 so expansion cards designed for two revisions are mutually incompatible.

Expansion cards designed for this interface included primarily combined audio and video cards, but also some combined SCSI and audio cards. The (possibly incomplete) list of Media Bus expansion cards presented here (all cards manufactured by Asus):

Media Bus rev. 1.2 cards

- PCI-AS7870 – Fast/Wide SCSI and audio card (Adaptec AIC-7870P and Vibra16s (with separate Yamaha YMF262-M))
- PCI-AV264CT – audio and video card (ATI Mach64 PCI 1 MiB (up to 2 MiB) and Vibra16s (with separate Yamaha YMF262-M))
- PCI-AV868 (pictured) – audio and video card (S3 Vision868 1 MiB and Vibra16s (with separate Yamaha YMF262-M))

Media Bus rev. 1.2 motherboards

- Asus P/I-P55SP4
- Asus P/I-P55TP4XE

Media Bus rev. 2.0 cards

- PCI-AS2940UW – Ultra Fast/Wide SCSI and audio card (Adaptec AIC-7880P and Vibra16s (with separate Yamaha YMF262-M))
- PCI-AS300 – Ultra Fast/Wide SCSI and audio card (Adaptec AIC-7880P and Vibra 16c)
- PCI-AV264CT-N – audio and video card (ATI Mach64 PCI 1 MiB (up to 2 MiB) and Vibra16c)
- PCI-AV264VT – audio and video card (ATI Mach64 PCI 1 MiB (up to 2 MiB) and Vibra16c)
- PCI-AV264GT – audio and video card (ATI Rage PCI 2 MiB and Vibra16c)
- PCI-AV264GT/Plus – audio and video card (ATI 3D Rage II 2 MiB (up to 4 MiB) and Vibra16c)

Media Bus rev. 2.0 motherboards Socket 7

- Asus P/E-P55T2P4D (Dual)
- Asus P/I-P55T2P4
- Asus P/I-P55TVP4
- Asus P/I-XP55T2P4
- Asus P/I-XP55T2P4S
- Asus P55TP4N
- Asus TXP4-X (optional?)
- Asus TX97
- Asus TX97-E

Media Bus rev. 2.0 motherboards Socket 8

- Asus P/I-P6NP5
- Asus P/I-P6RP4
- Asus P/I-XP6NP5
- Asus P65UP5 + P6ND CPU Card (Dual)
