= Bus-holder =

Weak latch circuit that holds the last value on a tri-state bus

The two inverters form a delay that holds the previous state of the bus and drives it back through a resistor.

A bus-holder or bus-keeper is a weak latch circuit that holds the last value on a tri-state bus.

The circuit is basically a delay element with the output connected back to the input through a relatively high impedance. This is usually achieved with two inverters connected in series, followed by a series resistor connected to the second inverter. The resistor drives the bus weakly; therefore other circuits can override the value of the bus when they are not in tri-state mode.

Bus-holders are used to prevent CMOS gate inputs from getting floating values when they are connected to tri-stated nets. Otherwise both transistors in the gate could get turned partially on, increasing power consumption and noise. In severe cases, this increased power consumption can destroy the CMOS gate. This is prevented by the bus-holder pulling the input to the last valid logic level (0 or 1) on the net. The circuit is usually placed in parallel with the tri-stated net.
