= External Bus Interface =

Computer bus

EBI
- External Bus Interface

The external bus interface, usually shortened to EBI, is a computer bus for interfacing small peripheral devices like flash memory with the processor. It is used to expand the internal bus of the processor to enable connection with external memories or other peripherals. EBI can be used to share I/O pins controlling memory devices that are connected to two different memory controllers. Use of EBI reduces the total number of system pins required causing the system cost to come down. EBI manufacturers include Barco, Freescale Semiconductor, Microchip, Atmel, and Silicon Labs.

== See also ==
- ARM9
- Peripheral Component Interconnect
