= Vectored I/O =

Input/output method in computing

In computing, vectored I/O, also known as scatter/gather I/O, is a method of input and output by which a single procedure call sequentially reads data from multiple buffers and writes it to a single data stream (gather), or reads data from a data stream and writes it to multiple buffers (scatter), as defined in a vector of buffers. Scatter/gather refers to the process of gathering data from, or scattering data into, the given set of buffers. Vectored I/O can operate synchronously or asynchronously. The main reasons for using vectored I/O are efficiency and convenience.

Vectored I/O has several potential uses:

- Atomicity: if the particular vectored I/O implementation supports atomicity, a process can write into or read from a set of buffers to or from a file without risk that another thread or process might perform I/O on the same file between the first process' reads or writes, thereby corrupting the file or compromising the integrity of the input
- Concatenating output: an application that wants to write non-sequentially placed data in memory can do so in one vectored I/O operation. For example, writing a fixed-size header and its associated payload data that are placed non-sequentially in memory can be done by a single vectored I/O operation without first concatenating the header and the payload to another buffer
- Efficiency: one vectored I/O read or write can replace many ordinary reads or writes, and thus save on the overhead involved in syscalls
- Splitting input: when reading data held in a format that defines a fixed-size header, one can use a vector of buffers in which the first buffer is the size of that header; and the second buffer will contain the data associated with the header

Standards bodies document the applicable functions readv and writev in POSIX 1003.1-2001 and the Single UNIX Specification version 2. The Windows API has analogous functions ReadFileScatter and WriteFileGather; however, unlike the POSIX functions, they require the alignment of each buffer on a memory page. Winsock provides separate WSASend and WSARecv functions without this requirement.

While working directly with a vector of buffers can be significantly harder than working with a single buffer, using higher-level APIs for working efficiently can mitigate the difficulties.

== Examples ==
The following example in the C programming language prints "Hello, Wikipedia Community!" to the standard output. Each word is saved into a single buffer and with only one call to writev(), all buffers are printed to the standard output.

#include <stdio.h>
#include <stdlib.h>
#include <string.h>

#include <unistd.h>
#include <sys/uio.h>

int main(int argc, char *argv[])
{
	const char buf1[] = "Hello, ";
	const char buf2[] = "Wikipedia ";
	const char buf3[] = "Community!\n";

	struct iovec bufs[] = {
		{ .iov_base = (void *)buf1, .iov_len = strlen(buf1) },
		{ .iov_base = (void *)buf2, .iov_len = strlen(buf2) },
		{ .iov_base = (void *)buf3, .iov_len = strlen(buf3) },
	};

	if (writev(STDOUT_FILENO, bufs, sizeof(bufs) / sizeof(bufs[0])) == -1)
	{
		perror("writev()");
		exit(EXIT_FAILURE);
	}

	return EXIT_SUCCESS;
}

=== Rust ===
Rust provides the write_vectored method on the Write trait.

use std::io::IoSlice;
use std::io::prelude::*;
use std::fs::File;

fn main() -> std::io::Result<()> {
    let data1 = [1; 8];
    let data2 = [15; 8];
    let io_slice1 = IoSlice::new(&data1);
    let io_slice2 = IoSlice::new(&data2);

    let mut buffer = File::create("foo.txt")?;

    // Writes some prefix of the byte string, not necessarily all of it.
    buffer.write_vectored(&[io_slice1, io_slice2])?;
    Ok(())
}

== See also ==
- Zero copy
