= Parallel communication =

Method of data transmission in which bits are conveyed in parallel

Parallel versus serial communication

In data transmission, parallel communication is a method of conveying multiple binary digits (bits) simultaneously using multiple conductors. This contrasts with serial communication, which conveys only a single bit at a time; this distinction is one way of characterizing a communications link.

The basic difference between a parallel and a serial communication channel is the number of electrical conductors used at the physical layer to convey bits. Parallel communication implies more than one such conductor. For example, an 8-bit parallel channel will convey eight bits (or a byte) simultaneously, whereas a serial channel would convey those same bits sequentially, one at a time. If both channels operated at the same clock speed, the parallel channel would be eight times faster. A parallel channel may have additional conductors for other signals, such as a clock signal to pace the flow of data, a signal to control the direction of data flow, and handshaking signals.

Parallel communication is and always has been widely used within integrated circuits, in peripheral buses, and in memory devices such as RAM. Computer system buses, on the other hand, have evolved over time: parallel communication was commonly used in earlier system buses, whereas serial communications are prevalent in modern computers.

== Examples of parallel communication systems ==
- Internal buses: memory bus, system bus, and front-side bus, including various generations of DDR SDRAM and GDDR SDRAM
- IBM System/360 Direct Control Feature (1964). Standard System/360 had an eight-bit wide port. The process-control variant Model 44 had a 32-bit width.
- Legacy computer peripheral buses: ISA, ATA, SCSI, PCI, and the once-ubiquitous IEEE-1284 / Centronics "printer port"
- Laboratory Instrumentation bus IEEE-488
- (see more examples at computer bus)

== Comparison with serial links ==
Before the development of high-speed serial technologies, the choice of parallel links over serial links was driven by these factors:

- Speed: Superficially, the speed of a parallel data link is equal to the number of bits sent at one time times the bit rate of each individual path; doubling the number of bits sent at once doubles the data rate. In practice, clock skew reduces the speed of every link to the slowest of all of the links. However, parallel lines have lower latency than serial lines, which is why parallel lines are still used on memory buses like DDR SDRAM.
- Cable length or link length: Crosstalk creates interference between the parallel lines, and the effect worsens with the length of the communication link. This places an upper limit on the length of a parallel data connection that is usually shorter than a serial connection.
- Complexity: Parallel data links are easily implemented in hardware, making them a logical choice. Creating a parallel port in a computer system is relatively simple, requiring only a latch to copy data onto a data bus. In contrast, most serial communication must first be converted back into parallel form by a universal asynchronous receiver/transmitter (UART) before they may be directly connected to a data bus.

The decreasing cost and better performance of integrated circuits has led to serial links being used in favor of parallel links; for example, IEEE 1284 printer ports vs. USB, Parallel ATA vs. Serial ATA, and FireWire or Thunderbolt are now the most common connectors for transferring data from audiovisual (AV) devices such as digital cameras or professional-grade scanners that used to require purchasing a SCSI HBA years ago.

One huge advantage of having fewer wires/pins in a serial cable is the significant reduction in the size, the complexity of the connectors, and the associated costs. Designers of devices such as smartphones benefit from the development of connectors/ports that are small, durable, and still provide adequate performance.

On the other hand, there has been a resurgence of parallel data links in RF communication. Rather than transmitting one bit at a time (as in Morse code and BPSK), well-known techniques such as PSM, PAM, and Multiple-input multiple-output communication send a few bits in parallel. (Each such group of bits is called a "symbol"). Such techniques can be extended to send an entire byte at once (256-QAM).

== See also ==
- Data transmission
- Serial port
- Bit-level parallelism
