= Tandy 5000 MC =

MCA-compatible computer made by Tandy

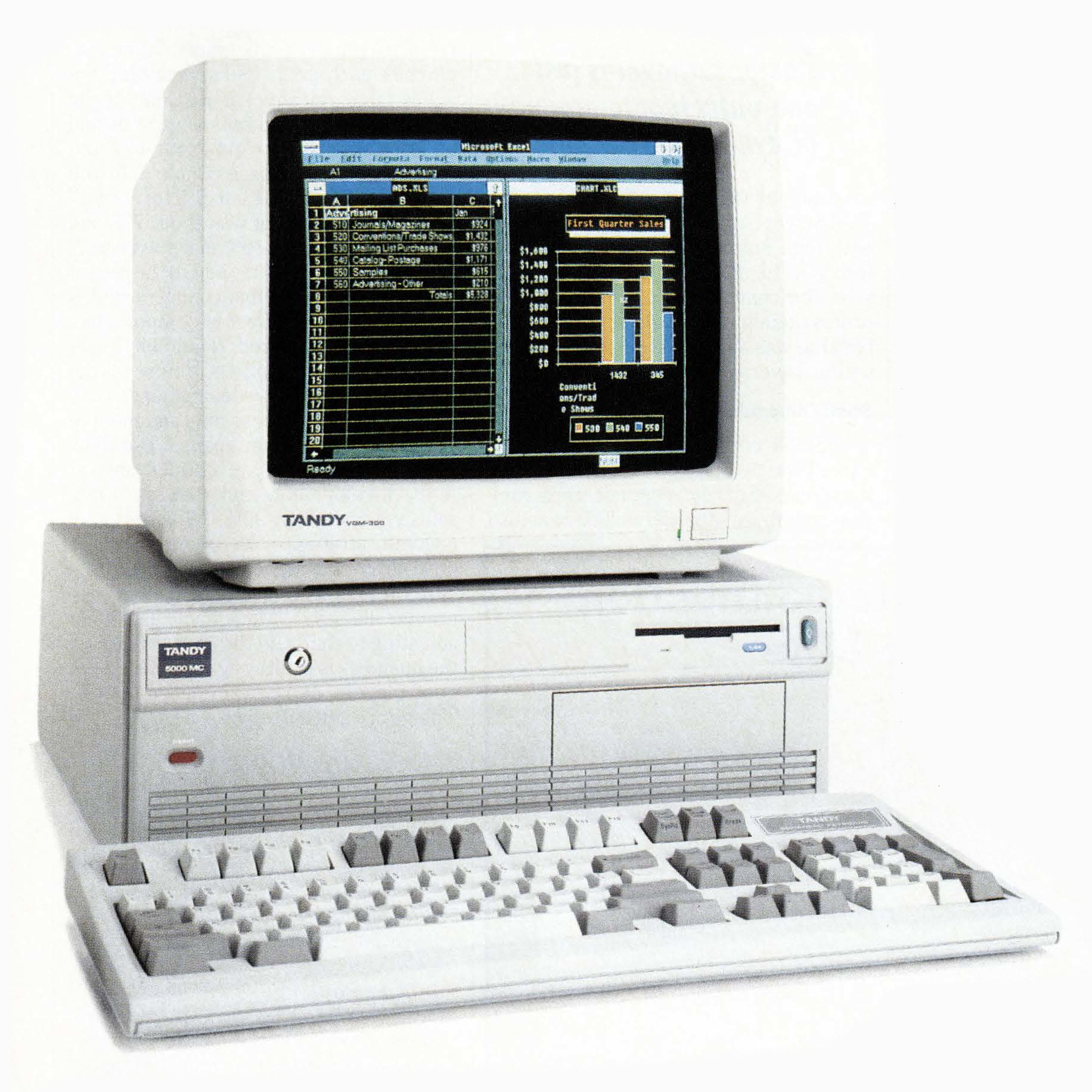
- Developer: Tandy Corporation
- Manufacturer: Tandy Corporation
- Type: Personal computer (desktop)
- Released: April 21, 1988; 38 years ago
- Availability: July 1988
- CPU: Intel 80386 @ 20 MHz
- Memory: 2–16 MB SIMMs
- Storage: Up to 170 MB SCSI hard disk drive
- Graphics: Video Graphics Array
- Dimensions: 17 by 16 by 6.5 inches (43 by 41 by 17 cm)
- Backward compatibility: IBM Personal System/2

The Tandy 5000 MC is a computer released by Tandy Corporation in 1988. The 5000 MC was the first PS/2 clone, featuring the Micro Channel architecture, an expansion bus technology developed by IBM and, until the 5000 MC, used exclusively on their Personal System/2 (PS/2) line of personal computers. Despite strong reviews from the technology press, the 5000 MC sold poorly.

== Specifications ==
The Tandy 5000 MC sports a beige, horizontal desktop case measuring 17 by 16 by 6.5 inches (43 by 41 by 17 cm). Tandy modeled the 5000 MC after the IBM's PS/2 Model 70, although it is physically larger than the latter in all dimensions and features two more expansion slots as well an additional drive bay. The 5000 MC's front panel includes a reset button at far left, recessed behind the plastic trim of the front panel to prevent accidental actuation; a push-button power switch at far right; an LED power indicator; and an intrusion key lock that prevents the case from being opened when locked (unlike some other computer systems, the lock does not disable the keyboard). The front panel houses the 5000 MC's four drive bays, of which the top two accommodate 3.5-inch drives and the other two accommodate 5.25-inch drives. Hidden behind the front panel is a 2-inch PC speaker.

As stock, the computer came shipped with a 1.44-MB, 3.5-inch floppy drive (a Sony MFD-17W-70D). The technology and capacity of the hard disk drive (HDD) varied depending on the model of 5000 MC ordered. On the low end, the computer came shipped a ST-506-compatible, 40-MB HDD that connects to Adaptec's MCA-based ACB-2610 hard drive controller card. At the higher end, the computer could have been ordered with either an 140-MB ESDI HDD and matching controller, and at the highest end, the computer could have been ordered with a 170-MB SCSI HDD and matching controller.

Inside, the 5000 MC features a motherboard with five Micro Channel architecture (MCA) slots: two standard 16-bit MCA slots, two 32-bit MCA slots, and a single 16-bit MCA slot with an additional row of pins for specialized 8514/A graphics cards. The computer's 20-MHz Intel 386 microprocessor is located on a daughterboard that connects to the motherboard through a proprietary connector on the far left of the motherboard. This daughterboard also contains a 40-MHz crystal oscillator that drives the microprocessor, a Intel 82385 cache controller, 32 KB of external cache, and a math coprocessor slot for the optional Weitek 3167. At the opposite end of the CPU daughterboard are two proprietary slots for Tandy's own RAM cards for the 5000 MC; these boards contain eight SIMM slots for 256-KiB or 1-MiB SIMM RAM. The 5000 MC can support up to 16 MB of RAM, from a minimum of 2 MB.

Emulating IBM's approach with the Personal System/2 (PS/2) series, the 5000 MC's motherboard is highly integrated and features a number of controllers on the board that negate the need for dedicated expansion cards. It includes a graphics controller compatible with the Video Graphics Array (VGA) standard, with the corresponding VGA connector located at the rear of the system. The motherboard also integrates a 9-pin, RS-232 serial port, a bidirectional parallel port, and two PS/2 ports for a mouse and keyboard.

The computer's BIOS was developed by Phoenix Technologies and was modeled after IBM's higher-end PS/2 Model 80, instead of the midrange PS/2 Model 70 that the 5000 MC's hardware was modeled after. Tandy expected users to configure the bulk of the 5000 MC's internal settings through software a la the PS/2. Unlike the PS/2 however, and harking back to the original IBM Personal Computer, the motherboard of the 5000 MC contains a bank of DIP switches for configuring settings permanently through hardware. Tandy shipped the 5000 MC with MS-DOS 3.3, as well as DeskMate 3.0, a version of Tandy's own in-house operating environment.

== Development and release ==
Tandy Corporation announced the 5000 MC on April 21, 1988, a little over one year after IBM announced the PS/2 line as their means of introducing the Micro Channel architecture. MCA was IBM's attempt at reclaiming the market share for PCs that they had lost to the compatibles industry. The industry thrived because of the open standard of the IBM PC's Industry Standard Architecture (ISA) bus; by contrast, IBM heavily enforced their patents on Micro Channel to interested third-party vendors such as Tandy. The 5000 MC was the second third-party MCA computer announced to the public, four days after Dell Computer Corporation announced two such MCA-compatible computers. However, Tandy beat Dell to market with the 5000 MC for the first MCA-compatible computer when they shipped the first units out in the last week of July 1988. The 5000 MC's compatibility with Micro Channel was achieved through a five-chip chipset released by Intel, the 82310 family. Tandy's announcement of the 5000 MC marked the first public disclosure of the existence of this chipset, with the 5000 MC also being the first publicly released product to implement it.

Following Tandy's purchase of Grid Systems in 1988, Tandy resold the 5000 MC as the Grid DESK-386mc (or simply Grid 386mc). The 386mc (along with the simultaneously announced, ISA-based Grid DESK-286is) was the first desktop computer offered by Grid, who previously designed only laptops and portable computers.

Tandy sold the 5000 MC through their Radio Shack retail locations, as well as their Tandy and Grid direct sales channels. Tandy also offered the 5000 MC via monthly lease to commercial buyers. The 5000 MC initially retailed for US$8499 (equivalent to $23,137 in 2025), for a system equipped with 2 MB of RAM. The 5000 MC sold very poorly, according to The New York Times, who interpreted Tandy's own comments in the press as showing "open contempt" for the system and its Micro Channel architecture. John V. Roach, Tandy's CEO at the time, quipped less than a month after its release: "I don't think it's been disappointing at all. I'm surprised anybody at all would want it".

== Reception ==
PC Week evaluated the 5000 MC's processing speed as slightly faster than IBM's PS/2 Model 70-121 as well as comparable 386-based machines such as the Compaq Deskpro 386/20e. However, he rated the ST-506-based HDD of his evaluation unit poorly, being slower than the PS/2 Model 70's HDD by about half. He found the computer broadly MCA compatible as advertised, and wrote overall that, "[a]t the very least, Tandy earns high marks for a well-designed computer that can be easily upgraded with a variety of hard drives", calling it "a surprisingly strong beginning for alternative Micro Channel computers". Sister publication PC Magazine summarized: "As a first effort at Micro Channel compatibility, the Tandy 5000 MC is a surprisingly good computer. In fact, it's an excellent choice for a high-performance desktop PC, regardless of what bus is in inside. Were all compatibles executed as well as the 5000 MC is, the Micro Channel might just become a quality as well as a performance standard". Rival publication InfoWorld, comparing a number of MCA-compatible machines, agreed, concluding: "Tandy's system beats IBM's Model 70-121 by $500 in list price, and provides the best performance in its class of any machine in this comparison".

PC World wrote: "Simply put, the 5000 MC has nearly everything that the Model 70-121 has, plus better performance, larger memory capacity, and more room for boards and drives". Though the publication noticed a number of patch wires on the motherboard, the magazine wrote that the 5000 MC was "a better Micro Channel machine for a lower price" than IBM's PS/2 Model 70. "[T]he big question is whether you want a Micro Channel machine at all", the magazine added.

== See also ==
- Apricot VX FT, another MCA-compatible system and the first computer system with an i486 processor released the to public
