= List of third-party Micro Channel computers =

This is a list of computer systems based on the Micro Channel architecture that were not manufactured by IBM, mainly by Micro Channel Developers Association members. Such third-party computers were also referred to as PS/2 clones or MCA clones. The first third-party Micro Channel–based computer was Tandy Corporation's 5000 MC in July 1988. Despite expensive research and development costs on the part of third-party manufacturers of Micro Channel computers—in part due to the expensive licensing fees incurred by IBM in order to allow legal use of their technology—by 1990 most MCA clones were not fully compatible with the Micro Channel architecture or expansion cards and peripherals based on Micro Channel. By the time IBM was winding down the PS/2 line of personal computers (which in 1987 acted as the means of introducing Micro Channel to the general public) in 1992, NCR Corporation remained one of the few committed vendors of MCA clones.

== Systems ==
Mfg.	Model	Processor	Clock speed (MHz)	L2 cache (KB)	HDD	Stock/min. memory	Max. memory (MB)	Form factor	Date introduced	Ref(s).
ALR	PowerPro/MC	Intel 80486	33	64–512 (CachePak boards)	—	5	49	Tower	January 1991	
ALR	PowerPro/MC SMP/DMP	Intel 80486 or Intel 80486DX2 (optionally dual)	33 (i486); 50 (i486DX)	64–512 (CachePak boards)	—	5	49	Tower	January 1992	
ALR	PowerCache 4	Intel 80486	25	128	150 MB or 340 MB (SCSI)	2	32	Tower or desktop	July 1990 (c.)	
ALR	Modular Processor System (a.k.a. MPS)	Intel 80386 or Intel 80486	25 (i486) or 33 (i386 and i486)	64–512	— (non-SCSI)	1	49	Desktop	November 1990	
ALR	Modular Processor System 486ASX (a.k.a. MPS II)	Intel 80486SX	20	64–512	None (Model 80) or 80 MB (Model 101)	1	49	Desktop	April 1991	
ALR	MicroFlex 3300	Intel 80386	33	32–64	70 MB or 120 MB or 642 MB	2	64	Tower	October 1990	
ALR	MicroFlex 7000	Intel 80386	25	128	120 MB or 300 MB (ESDI)	2	16	Tower	January 1989	
Apricot	Qi 300	Intel 80386SX	16	None	30 MB (RLL) or 50 MB (SCSI) or 120 MB	2	8	Desktop	February 1989	
Apricot	Qi 600 (a.k.a. Qi PCi)	Intel 80386	25	64	50 MB (RLL) – 510 MB (SCSI)	1	16	Desktop	February 1989	
Apricot	Qi 900	Intel 80486	25	64	50 MB or 80 MB or 100 MB or 380 MB	1	16	Desktop	April 1990	
Apricot	Qi 486SX-16	Intel 80486SX	25	128	50 MB (RLL) – 510 MB (SCSI)	1	16	Desktop	May 1992	
Apricot	Qi 486DX-25	Intel 80486	25	128	50 MB (RLL) – 510 MB (SCSI)	1	16	Desktop	April 1991 (c.)	
Apricot	Qi 486DX-33	Intel 80486	33	128	50 MB (RLL) – 510 MB (SCSI)	1	16	Desktop	May 1992	
Apricot	Qi 486DX2-50	Intel 80486DX2	50	128	50 MB (RLL) – 510 MB (SCSI)	1	16	Desktop	May 1992	
Apricot	Qi 486DX2-66	Intel 80486DX2	66	128	50 MB (RLL) – 510 MB (SCSI)	1	16	Desktop	May 1992	
Apricot	VX FT (Note: According to a Byte magazine cover story, the Apricot VX FT was the first i486-based computer system ever released.)	Intel 80386 or Intel 80486	25	64 or 128	157 MB or 347 MB or 647 MB or 1.05 GB	4	16	Tower	September 1989	
Apricot	FTs (a.k.a. FT Mk II)	Intel 80486SX or Intel 80486 or Intel 80486DX2 (optionally dual)	25 (i486SX) or 33 (i486) or 50 or 66 (i486DX2)	—	50 MB or 100 MB or 200 MB or 380 MB or 510 MB or 1.2 GB	1	16	Tower	June 1991	
Apricot	FTe	Intel 80486SX or Intel 80486 or Intel 80486DX2	25 (i486SX or i486) or 33 (i486) or 50 or 66 (i486DX2)	None	50 MB or 100 MB or 200 MB or 380 MB or 510 MB or 1.2 GB	1	16	Full-tower	July 1991	
Apricot	FT//s	Intel 80486DX2 or Intel Pentium	66 (i486DX2) or 60 (Pentium)	—	Various	192 (i486DX2) or 256 (Pentium)	192 (i486DX2) or 256 (Pentium)	Tower	June 1993	
Apricot	FT//e	Intel 80486DX2 or Intel Pentium	66 (i486DX2) or 60 (Pentium)	—	Various	192 (i486DX2) or 256 (Pentium)	192 (i486DX2) or 256 (Pentium)	Full-tower	June 1993	
Bull	Micral 500	Intel 80386	20	—	200 MB	—	—	Desktop	October 1989 (c.)	
Cumulus	GL Computer/MC 386SX	Intel 80386SX	25	—	80 MB	2	—	Desktop	July 1992	
Cumulus	GL Computer/MC 486	Intel 80486	33	—	200 MB	4	—	Desktop	July 1992	
First Class; Systems	325i	Intel 80386	25	—	40 MB	2	16	Desktop	April 1990	
First Class; Systems	F16/SX	Intel 80386SX	16	—	40 MB	1	8	Desktop	November 1989	
First Class; Systems	F20/DX	Intel 80386	20	—	40 MB	2	16	Desktop	November 1989	
Grid	Desk 386mc	Intel 80386	20	—	—	2	16	Desktop	April 1989 (c.)	
Leading; Edge	Model D3/MC	Intel 80386SX	16	—	—	1	4	Desktop	April 1990	
Memorex (Note: OEMed by Normerel SA, a division of SMT Goupil)	Telex Model 7255	Intel 80386	16	—	—	4	8	Desktop	February 1990	
Memorex	Telex Model 7270 (Note: Rebadged MiTAC MPS-3000F)	Intel 80386	25	32	—	4	8	Desktop	June 1990	
Memorex	Telex Model 8257	Intel 80386SX	20	—	—	—	—	—	February 1992	
Memorex	Telex Model 8290	Intel 80486SX	33	—	—	—	—	—	February 1992	
Memorex	Telex Model 9290 (Note: Clone of the IBM PS/2 Model 90 XP 486)	Intel 80486DX2	50	—	—	—	64	Desktop	November 1992 (c.)	
MiTAC	MPS-3000F	Intel 80386	25	32	—	1	24	Desktop	January 1990	
MiTAC	MPS-2386	Intel 80386SX	16	—	40 MB or 100 MB	1	24	Desktop	March 1989 (c.)	
NCR	System 3320	Intel 80386SX	20	—	44 MB or 100 MB	2	8	Desktop	1990	
NCR	System 3325	Intel 80486SX (-2XXX-...); Intel 80486DX (-3XXX-...); Intel 80486DX2 (-4XXX-...); Intel 80486DX4 (-7XXX-...)	33 (i486SX/DX); 66 (i486DX2); 100 (i486DX4)	—	—	0	16 (i486SX) or 128	Small form factor desktop	1990	
NCR	System 3335	Intel 80486SX	25	1	16	0	128	Small form factor desktop	November 1991	
NCR	System 3340	Intel 80486	25	—	100 MB or 200 MB	2	16	Desktop	1990	
NCR	System 3345	Intel 80486	33	—	100 MB or 200 MB or 340 MB	4	64	Desktop	1990	
NCR	System 3350	Intel 80486SX or Intel 80486DX2	25 or 33 (i486SX); 66 (i486DX2)	—	120 MB or 213 MB or 340 MB or 535 MB or 1.05 GB	4	192	Desktop	1990	
NCR	System 3360	Intel Pentium (optionally dual)	60	—	—	0	512 (parity-based); 256 (EDAC-based)	Tower	1990	
NCR	System 3410	Intel 80486SX or Intel 80486DX2	33 (i486SX); 66 (i486DX2)	—	213 MB or 340 MB or 535 MB or 1.05 GB	4	192	Tower	1990	
NCR	System 3416	Intel Pentium (optionally dual)	60	—	—	0	256 (EDAC-based, -1000 and -1002 models); 512 (parity-based, -1010 model)	Tower	1990	
NCR	System 3430	Intel Pentium (optionally dual)	60	256	—	0	256 (EDAC-based, -1000 and -1002 models); 512 (parity-based, -1010 model)	Tower	1990	
NCR	System 3445	Intel 80486	33	—	None or 200 MB or 327 MB or 670 MB	4	16	Tower	1990	
NCR	System 3550	Intel 80486DX2 (up to 8 identical processors)	50	256 (external; 8 KB internally per processor)	320 MB – 13 GB	16	256	Tower	1990	
Research; Machines	Nimbus PC-286	Intel 80286	10	—	40 MB or 60 MB or 120 MB	1	16	Desktop	April 1989	
Research; Machines	Nimbus PC-386	Intel 80386	16	—	40 MB or 60 MB or 120 MB	1	16	Desktop	April 1989	
Olivetti	P500	Intel 80386	16	—	40 MB or 80 MB or 135 MB (ESDI)	1	16	Desktop	July 1989	
Olivetti	P700 (Note: Rebadged MiTAC MPS-3000F)	Intel 80386	25	32	—	1	24	Desktop	July 1991	
Olivetti	P750	Intel 80486	25	—	100 MB or 200 MB	2	32	Desktop	August 1990	
Olivetti	P800	Intel 80386	25	64	135 MB	4	16	Tower	July 1989	
Olivetti	M300-25 (a.k.a. P500/E)	Intel 80386SX	20	—	60 MB	2	16	Desktop	—	
Olivetti	M480-30	Intel 80486	25	—	210 MB or 270 MB or 340 MB or 510 MB or 525 MB	4	32	Desktop	—	
Olivetti	M480-40	Intel 80486	33	—	210 MB or 340 MB or 525 MB	4	32	Desktop	—	
Olivetti	M480-50	Intel 80486DX2	50	—	—	—	64	Desktop	July 1993 (c.)	
Olivetti	M480-60	Intel 80486	50	—	210 MB or 340 MB or 525 MB	8	16	Tower	—	
Olivetti	M6-520	Intel 80486SX or Pentium OverDrive	25	Optional	120 MB or 210 MB or 525 MB or 1.05 GB	8	64	Desktop	—	
Olivetti	M6-540	Intel 80486 or Pentium OverDrive	33	Optional	120 MB or 210 MB or 525 MB or 1.05 GB	8	64	Desktop	—	
Olivetti	M6-560	Intel 80486DX2 or Pentium OverDrive	66	Optional	120 MB or 210 MB or 525 MB or 1.05 GB	8	64	Desktop	—	
Reply	286/16	Intel 80286	16	0	30 MB or 60 MB or 120 MB (EDSI)	2	8	Desktop	November 1989	
Reply	286/20	Intel 80286	20	0	30 MB or 60 MB or 120 MB (EDSI)	2	8	Desktop	November 1989	
Reply	386SX/16	Intel 80386SX	16	0	30 MB or 60 MB or 120 MB (EDSI)	2	8	Desktop	March 1990	
Reply	386SX/20	Intel 80386SX	20	0	30 MB or 60 MB or 120 MB (EDSI)	2	16	Desktop	March 1990	
Reply	Model 16	Intel 80286 or Intel 80386SX	16 or 20	0	30 MB or 60 MB or 120 MB or 325 MB (EDSI)	8	8	Small form factor desktop	March 1990	
Reply	Model 16 386SLC	IBM 386SLC	20	0	120 MB	4	8	Small form factor desktop	August 1992	
Reply	Model 16 486SLC2	IBM 486SLC2	40	0	120 MB	4	16	Small form factor desktop	December 1992	
Reply	Model 32	Intel 80386 or Intel 80486SX or Intel 80486	25–33 (386) or 20 (486SX) or 25–50 (486DX)	64 (386DX at 25 MHz) or 128 (386DX at 33 MHz)	40 MB – 1.2 GB (EDSI)	4–16	32 (64 with adapter)	Small form factor desktop	November 1990	
SNI	PCM-3Dsx	Intel 80386	16 (386)	0	40 MB – 160 MB (EDSI)	4	16	Small form factor desktop	November 1990	
SNI	PCM-4T/33	Intel 80486	33 (486)	0	330 MB – 660 MB – 1000 MB (SCSI)	8	16	Tower	December 1991	
Tandy	5000 MC (Note: The first Micro Channel–based personal computer not manufactured by IBM)	Intel 80386	20	—	40 MB (ST-506) or 84 MB	2	16	Desktop	July 1988	
Wang	MC 350/16S	Intel 80386	16	—	20 MB or 40 MB or 100 MB	2	8	Desktop	September 1989	
Wells American	CompuStar (Note: The CompuStar was a hybrid ISA–Micro Channel system. Its motherboard featured a modular bus design featuring two riser card slots, allowing for five ISA cards on a riser card in one slot and five MCA cards on a riser card in the other slot. Alternatively, users could install two riser cards of identical busses to give the computer 10 ISA slots or 10 Micro Channel slots.)	Intel 8086 or Intel 80286 or Intel 80386	5–10 (8088) or 20 (80286) or 16–25 (80386)	—	—	—	2.5 (8086) or 16 (80286 and 80386)	Tower	September 1988	
WLT; Systems (Note: Mail-order subsidiary of Wang Laboratories)	PC Express MC-316S-5	Intel 80386SX	16	—	—	2	8	Desktop	March 1990	

== See also ==
- Micro Channel Developers Association
- List of IBM PS/2 models
