= Micro Channel Developers Association =

Technology consortium

- Type: Non-profit industry consortium
- Founded: October 1990; 35 years ago
- Defunct: 1997; 29 years ago
- Fate: Dissolved
- Website: microchanneldepot.com at the Wayback Machine (archived April 5, 1997)

The Micro Channel Developers Association (MCDA) was a consortium of computer manufacturers that sought to consider and prioritize steps in the maturation of the Micro Channel architecture, as well as to explore better approaches to disseminating technical information about Micro Channel to third parties.

== History ==
Micro Channel was a computer bus architecture introduced by International Business Machines Corporation (IBM) with their Personal System/2 family of computers in 1987. Intended as the replacement to the de facto Industry Standard Architecture (ISA) IBM pioneered with the IBM PC, Micro Channel was met with backlash over IBM's exorbitant licensing costs, and several computer companies, most influentially Compaq, formed a committee that developed the Extended Industry Standard Architecture (EISA) in 1988. EISA saw popularity in workstations and desktop servers in the following years. While PS/2s also enjoyed modest success in those markets, Micro Channel was seldom licensed for official clones during its first years, leading to a perception of IBM among peripheral manufacturers as a domineering patent holder. The Micro Channel Developers Association was formed in October 1990 as a response to this perception and EISA's emergence.

Membership in the MCDA carried an annual fee of $2,500. EISA manufacturers were not barred from entrance or invitation; spokespersons for MCDA contacted Compaq, lead architect of EISA, to join their consortium, as they did to EISA co-founders Olivetti and NEC. Out of the over 800 companies developing Micro Channel products (at least those assigned numerical vendor IDs by IBM, to be read by the IBM's BIOS for MCA machines), only 14 comprised the Micro Channel Developers Association on its formation. This included IBM, Intel, Chips and Technologies, NCR Corporation, Olivetti, Apricot Computers, Western Digital, Siemens Nixdorf, AOX Inc., Reply Corporation, Core International, Cumulus Corporation, and National Software Testing Laboratories. NEC later joined, in November that year. MCDA grew to 92 member companies by the first quarter of 1992.

Even after IBM discontinued Micro Channel and the PS/2 in July 1995, the Micro Channel Developers Association still oversaw the development of hundreds of MCA cards and peripherals as late as May 1996, owing to its widespread use in IBM's line of RS/6000 servers and workstations. The consortium fizzled in 1997, however.

== Member list ==
March 1992

- Accton Technology Corporation
- Adaptec
- Advanced Logic Research
- Aox Inc.
- Apricot Computers
- AST Research Japan K.K.
- Beall Technologies
- Beijing Legend Computer Group
- Brooktrout Technology
- Brother Industries
- Cabletron Systems
- Chips and Technologies
- Ciprico Inc.
- Cirrus Logic
- CMS Enhancements
- Communica Inc.
- Computer Elektronik Infosys
- Core International
- Cornerstone Technology
- Cumulus Corporation
- Dale Computer Corporation
- Data-Plane Technologies
- D-Link Corporation
- Electrim Corporation
- ELSA Technology
- Equinox Systems
- Future Domain Corporation
- Headland Technology
- Hitachi
- Hypertec Research
- IBM
- IBM Japan
- Infotronic S.p.A.
- Intel Corporation
- Interphase Corporation
- JustSystems
- Kingston Technology
- Kung Ying Enterprises
- Leading Edge Hardware Products
- Madge Networks
- Matsushita Electric Industrial
- Memorex Telex Corporation
- Memorex Telex Japan
- Micrel, Inc.
- Microsystems Co., Ltd.
- Miro Datensysteme
- MiTAC
- Mitsubishi Electric America
- MPR Teltech
- National Instruments
- National Software Testing Laboratories
- NCMIKRO A/S
- NCP Engineering
- NCR Corporation
- Oki Electric Industry
- Olivetti S.p.A.
- Palyn Associates
- Parallan Computer
- Pencom Systems
- Phoenix Technologies
- Piiceon, Inc.
- Plaintree Systems
- Quatech, Inc.
- Racore Computer Products
- Radius Inc.
- RasterOps Corporation
- Reply Corporation
- Research Machines
- Rexon–Tecmar Inc.
- Ricoh Company
- Sage Group
- Sanyo Electric
- Seattle Telecom & Data
- Sharp Corporation
- Siemens Nixdorf Informationssysteme
- Spea Software
- Stac Electronics
- Stargate Technologies
- Stratus Computer
- Sumitomo Electric USA
- Synaptel
- Systech Corporation
- Toshiba America Electronic Components
- Tseng Laboratories
- TT-Timecon OY
- VLSI Technology
- VME Microsystems
- XXCAL Inc.
