= Xebec Corporation =

Former American computer hardware company

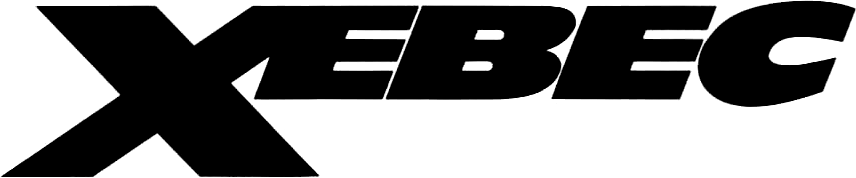
- Formerly: Microcomputer Systems Corporation (1974–1983)
- Company type: Public
- Industry: Computer
- Founded: 1969; 57 years ago in Sunnyvale, California, U.S.
- Founder: Jim Toreson (co-founder)
- Defunct: July 31, 1989; 36 years ago
- Fate: Dissolution
- Number of employees: 1,200 (1984, peak)
- Divisions: First Class Peripherals

Xebec Corporation, formerly Microcomputer Systems Corporation, was an American computer hardware company active from 1969 to 1989. The company was primarily known for their data storage products, especially their hard disk controller ICs. A major customer of Xebec was IBM, who used their disk controllers extensively in the PC XT in 1983, their first PC with a hard drive preinstalled.

== History ==
Brochure from 1984 showing disk subsystems and SCSI host adapters for multiple computer systems

=== Foundation (1969–1983) ===
Xebec took root in two separate companies based in Silicon Valley: Xebec Corporation, founded in 1969 in Sunnyvale, California, and Microcomputer Systems Corporation (MSC), founded in 1974 by James "Jim" Toreson in Santa Clara, California. Xebec was a diversified computer company that manufactured a variety of hardware, including handwritten OCR systems and disk controllers, while MSC was dedicated to mainframe and minicomputer disk controllers from the outset. In 1976, Microcomputer Systems moved to Sunnyvale from Santa Clara, occupying a 12,000-square-foot facility in the city; the company employed 20 people by that point. In July 1981, MSC acquired Xebec, which had been faltering in the marketplace and was on the brink of bankruptcy. Xebec then became a division of MSC, manufacturing the company's hard disk drives and disk controller boards based on MSC's patents. MSC had all but discarded Xebec's prior disk controller technology, Toreson denouncing them as "junk" in a 1982 interview: "Their company had several million dollars of venture capital poured into it, and we had none in ours, but we ultimately took them over with our technology".

In 1982, Xebec (under the auspices of MSC) introduced their first 5.25-inch hard drives and disk controllers for the Apple II at an uproarious booth showing at 1982's West Coast Computer Faire. These microcomputer-oriented products were a market success and led to Xebec moving their manufacturing presence into Gardnerville, Nevada in March 1983. (The move to Gardnerville was also partially fueled by concerns of industrial espionage, according to Toreson.) In February 1983, MSC filed to go public and changed its legal name to Xebec Corporation, adopting the name of its most successful subsidiary. Following the IPO, Xebec absorbed their eponymous subsidiary into their primary operations and cemented its focus on disk drive technologies.

=== Growth and decline (1983–1990) ===
By mid-1983, Xebec counted among its customer base such large computer companies as Hewlett-Packard, Philips Data, Texas Instruments, and Victor Technology. That same year, the company gained its largest customer yet in IBM, who signed a contract with Xebec worth US$200 million for Xebec's 1210 controller IC for use in IBM's upcoming PC XT—their first Personal Computer system with a hard drive preinstalled. When Xebec posted revenues of $57 million in 1983, at least a quarter of that figure was suspected to have been earned from the IBM deal. The company gained further clients in ITT, Mitsubishi, and Toshiba following the deal.

The IBM deal was initially a success story for Xebec, with employment at the company peaking at 1,200 in 1984. The deal worried Xebec's investors, however, who feared that IBM purchasing another company's controllers or even developing their own in-house controllers would cripple Xebec's revenues. Indeed, in 1984, IBM turned to other companies for their next generation of PC—the PC AT. Although IBM continued to source disk controllers from Xebec for the still-best-selling IBM PC XT, this nonetheless dealt a blow to Xebec's bottom line, and their financial situation suffered in the succeeding years. In an attempt to correct course by innovating, Xebec in late 1984 introduced the first hard drive built in the United States with the controller ICs soldered onto the drive's circuit board. Dubbed the Owl series, development of these drives required Xebec invest tens of millions of dollars in automation and robotics at their plants in Nevada and Lehigh Valley in eastern Pennsylvania. Xebec was one of the few companies in the United States sourcing their ICs entirely from companies in the United States; the majority of their competitors at the time were sourcing such ICs from East Asia.

In October 1984, Xebec launched a subsidiary named First Class Peripherals, which marketed HDD subsystems for the Apple II, the Macintosh, and the IBM PC and compatibles by mail order. Initially based in Bethlehem, Pennsylvania, First Class later relocated to Carson City, Nevada, to be closer to Xebec, which had moved to that city by 1985. In 1987, Xebec launched several more subsidiaries, including Epelo, which marketed Xebec's advanced disk controllers, and OMNI-Shore, which was Xebec's contract manufacturing arm.

In 1985, after further losses, Xebec consolidated two under-performing subsidiaries (Information Memories Corporation and Dastek) and shuttered their Lehigh Valley plant. Xebec suffered heavy losses in 1987, after IBM announced both the discontinuation of the PC XT and the introduction of their Personal System/2 series of personal computers—with disk controllers based on IBM's own silicon. Despite struggling, Xebec continued to supply controllers, disk drives, and tape backup systems for the following three years. In one of their last business dealings, in early 1988, Xebec sold off the patents to their tape drive technologies to Epelo, which had been spun off from Xebec. Xebec dissolved on July 31, 1989, after it filed for Chapter 7 bankruptcy. Following Xebec's collapse, Toreson spun off First Class Peripherals into a separate company, which traded as First Class Systems and produced clones of IBM's PS/2. First Class Systems itself dissolved in 1990 after only a year in operation.
