= NSTL =

NSTL refers to the

- National Software Testing Laboratories in Blue Bell, Pennsylvania
- National Soil Tilth Laboratory in Ames, Iowa
- former National Space Technology Laboratory, now John C. Stennis Space Center in Hancock County, Mississippi
- National Standards Testing Laboratory in Rockville, Maryland
- National Tree Seed Laboratory, Dry Branch, Georgia
- Navigation Systems & Technology Laboratory at NASA's Johnson Space Center in Houston
- National Strategic Target List of the Single Integrated Operational Plan
- National Security Threat List, sets out FBI's foreign counterintelligence mission
- Virtual Journal of Nanoscale Science & Technology, University of California
- National Science and Technology Library, China
- Naval Science and Technological Laboratory, An Indian national defense laboratory under DRDO, located in Visakhapatnam, Andhra Pradesh.
