= Cumulus Corporation =

American computer company

- Logo used after 1989
- Trade name: Cumulus Computer Corporation (1990–1993)
- Type: Private
- Industry: Computer
- Founded: June 1987; 39 years ago in Beachwood, Ohio
- Founder: Martin Alpert
- Defunct: April 1993; 33 years ago
- Fate: Bankruptcy liquidation
- Products: Memory expansion cards; CPU cards; desktop computers
- Number of employees: 350–450 (1992, peak)

Cumulus Corporation (often shortened to Cumulus Corp.) was an American computer peripheral and system manufacturer active from 1987 to 1993. Based in Beachwood, Ohio (a suburb of Cleveland) and started by Tecmar founder Martin Alpert, the company set out to exclusively manufacture expansion products for IBM's Personal System/2 (PS/2) family of computers—mainly RAM expansion cards. It later released cross-platform CPU upgrade cards and memory expansion cards for other platforms besides the PS/2. Beginning in 1990, the company began trading as Cumulus Computer Corporation and began releasing complete systems of their own. Initially a success story for the tech industry in Cleveland, a botched stock launch in 1992 proved disastrous for the company's ailing cash flow situation, and in 1993 the company was liquidated amid massive debt to suppliers and lenders.

== Foundation (1987–1988) ==
Cumulus Corporation was founded in Beachwood, Ohio, a suburb of Cleveland, in 1987 by Martin Alpert. Alpert, an M.D. and pulmonologist, was previously the head of Tecmar, a personal computer expansion card manufacturer that he founded in 1974 to manufacture and market his designs for medical diagnostic equipment. Shortly after IBM announced their Personal Computer in August 1981, Tecmar became one of the first third-party manufacturers to release expansion cards for the system. Alpert operated Tecmar as a private business until summer 1986, when he sold it to Rexon, Inc., of Culver City, California, for less than US$2.3 million. Alpert stayed on the board of directors, before leaving in October 1986. He admitted that Tecmar in the years leading up to its purchase lacked adequate "executive-level talent" in its management. Alpert set out Cumulus to first and foremost to design and manufacture peripherals for the Personal System/2 (PS/2), a family of computers introduced by IBM in April 1987, intended as the successor to their earlier IBM PC line. He funded the startup of Cumulus with his own money, purchasing an office in San Diego, California, to house Cumulus' full-time engineering staff.

Cumulus released its first products in August 1987: a multifunction board for the PS/2 Models 50 and 60 called CuRAM and an external 5.25-inch floppy disk drive called Stepping Stone. The Stepping Stone was released to address the PS/2's lack of a 5.25-inch floppy drive (IBM had adopted the newer 3.5-inch standard, developed by Sony Corporation, for the PS/2). Cumulus paired the drive with software and a controller card—the latter containing a specially burned PROM with microcode allowing the Stepping Stone to act as the primary (A:) drive. This opened the PS/2 to a larger back-catalog of IBM PC software; the installers of some contemporary applications on 5.25-inch disks, like Lotus 1-2-3, required being run from the A: floppy drive, as a form of copy protection.

The CuRAM multifunction board was in its bare state a RAM expansion card, available in two variants, 2 MB and 4 MB. Three separate daughterboards plugged into the CuRAM through a pin-header-and-socket arrangement. The first added two additional peripheral ports (one serial and one parallel); the second added a 2.4-kbps modem; and the third offered more memory, up to 8 MB. Through included software and driver files, users may designate the CuRAM's memory as either of three types of memory: extended, Expanded (LIM EMS 4.0 (Note: LIM standing for Lotus Development, Intel, and Microsoft, the three companies responsible for the LIM EMS standard)), and Enhanced Expanded (EEMS). Certain operating systems like Xenix could take advantage of extended memory, and it also allowed users to allocate RAM drives with more than the available memory within the 640 KB conventional memory of real mode PC DOS. In DOS environments, LIM EMS is useful for storing large blocks of data, while EEMS could be used to run multiple DOS programs concurrently. Critically, more than one CuRAM board could be installed and ran in a PS/2 at the same time, increasing the maximum memory to 16 MB. For the Model 50, this meant that that system could possess more RAM than IBM's prescribed upper limit of 7 MB, while leaving one of its three expansion slots open. Cumulus accomplished this by getting permission by IBM to use one of their reserved vendor ID for the CuRAM.

Intended for the 286-equipped Models 50 and 60, the CuRAM plugged into those computer's 16-bit Micro Channel expansion slots. Computer Reseller News wrote that Cumulus was the first American expansion board maker to harness the 1 μm process of semiconductor fabrication with the CuRAM in August 1987. In late March 1988, Cumulus released the CuRAM 80-8, a memory expansion card for the PS/2 Model 80 and the second 32-bit memory card ever released for the PS/2 (following after a similar product by AST Research). The CuRAM 80 supports up to 8 MB of RAM per card, upgraded in 2 MB intervals from the stock integrated 2 MB. Like its predecessor, the CuRAM 80 has sockets for the peripheral-port-addition and modem daughtercards. The CuRAM 80 was unveiled concurrently with an upgraded version of the original 16-bit CuRAM board—the CuRAM-2—which increased the maximum amount of RAM per card to 12 MB (up from 8 MB). The CuRAM-2 was offered in two different base configurations, with either 2 MB and 6 MB of soldered-on stock RAM.

Sales of the CuRAM family were less than expected, despite high interest. Alpert attributed this to widespread confusion over product specifications and compatibility among memory expansion cards in the PS/2 marketplace. By the end of 1987, Cumulus achieved a modest annual sales figure of $589,000.

== Diversification (1988–1990) ==
Amid a DRAM chip shortage in the beginning of 1988 and more difficulty in accounting for the production of multi-layer surface-mount PCBs than they expected, Cumulus turned to market other products in 1988. The company took the modem component of the CuRAM and built it into a standalone modem for the PS/2. Called the CuModem 2400, it was introduced sometime in early 1988. Bucking from their all-PS/2 approach, in July 1988, Cumulus announced the PaqRAM-1 and PaqRAM-4—respectively 1 and 4 MB memory expansion boards for Compaq's Deskpro 386. Cumulus announced the PaqRAMs amid a shortage of Compaq's own RAM modules in that company's inventory; the Deskpro 386 used a proprietary slot for expansion RAM. In November 1988, Cumulus announced the Classic, a line of portable hard drives. The only drive available at launch was 44 MB in capacity and in the 5.25-inch form factor. The company began work on a CPU upgrade card in late 1988. Named the 80386SX Card and released in winter 1989, the card plugs into a vacant Intel 80286 slot of a motherboard, giving it a faster i386SX chip clocked at 16 MHz while only covering a section of the motherboard less than 3 square inches (19 cm^{2}). A floating-point unit expansion daughterboard for the 80386SX Card, employing an 80387SX, was released in summer 1989.

In December 1988, Cumulus formed a joint venture with Network Systems Corporation to develop a proprietary interface based on the Fiber Distributed Data Interface (FDDI) protocol for Network System's Hyperchannel-DX family of network processor chips. The venture apparently fizzled in 1989 with Cumulus going in the field of FDDI-based networking equipment alone. In July 1989, they released the VMEbus-based MegaNet M100-9U network controller adapter in July 1989, which sold for $10,000. The adapter incorporated a 32-bit RISC from Advanced Micro Devices.

While a memory expansion board for the Macintosh II announced by Cumulus in November 1987—in an early deviation of their all-PS/2 business approach—proved to be vaporware, the company did release a 44-MB portable SCSI hard drive for the Macintosh, named the RD-44, in late 1989.

== Computer systems (1990–1992) ==
Although Alpert in a 1987 interview expressed wanting to avoid competing with the computer manufacturers that Cumulus supported with systems of their own, Cumulus Corporation renamed itself to Cumulus Computer Corporation in 1990 and introduced a number of desktop computer families that year. The first was the GLC/CO (an abbreviation for Good Little Computer/Corporate), a desktop based on the 16 MHz i386SX processor. Its defining feature was its passive backplane, with the CPU and memory residing on a proprietary CPU card plugged into one of the four ISA expansion slots, in an attempt to facilitate upgrades to newer processors in the future. Cumulus won Sears as a reseller of the GLC line, the latter company marketing the computer inside their Office Center store-within-a-store. The GLC/SBS (Good Little Computer/Small Business System), introduced in November 1990 and featuring a built-in combination fax modem–answering machine unit, intended to compete with IBM's PS/1 of personal computers for the home. Like the GLC/CO, the computer featured a 16 MHz i386SX on a CPU card. Computer journalists received it positively. Cumulus followed it up with their first i386DX-based machine, the GLC/DX (later renamed the GLC/33), in April 1991, and their first i486DX-based machine, the Cumulus/486, in May 1991—the latter available in tower, desktop, and pizza box form factors.

In August 1991, Cumulus introduced their WorkBox line of computers, the first entry being the WorkBox SX/40, a desktop computer running an i486SX clocked at 40 MHz. The WorkBox had six expansion slots, over the GLC's four, while fitting in a minitower case. Its motherboard featured the SCAT chipset by Chips and Technologies, and the computer shipped with a Paradise (Western Digital) SVGA graphics card. It received a mixed review in Computer Shopper, who particularly panned Cumulus' shorter-than-average 10-day return policy.

In July 1992, Cumulus introduced the GLC/MC line, a desktop computer with a Micro Channel bus directly competing with IBM's PS/2. Previewed at Boston Networld in winter 1992, the GLC/MC came in two variants, a 25 MHz i386SX–based unit with 2 MB of RAM stock and an 80 MB hard drive; and a 33 MHz i486–based unit with 4 MB of RAM stock and a 200 MB hard drive. The GLC/MC followed Cumulus's announcement of the final incarnation of CuRAM—the CuRAM-32—which supported up to 32 MB of RAM. In 1992, Cumulus commissioned Jetta International to build the motherboard for their first laptop, the Express 386SX/20, which was released in the summer of 1992. That same summer, Cumulus announced their intent to work on the design for a cellular phone, in a corporate refocus toward mobile computing.

== Liquidation (1992–1993) ==
By the end of 1991, Cumulus reached between $116 million and $121 million in sales and employed between 350 and 450. In May 1992, the company filed to go public with the SEC, mediated through Merrill Lynch & Company and Dillon, Read & Company, and issuing 2.5 million common shares—later increased to 2.8 million shares, at a maximum price of $11 per share, ($31.6 million). In anticipation of their stock launch, Bill Lowe—the former president of IBM's Entry Systems Division—joined Cumulus' board of directors and was named vice chairman.

Despite keeping appearances of a thriving company, Cumulus was crumbling internally under poor cash flow and externally from the fierce price war in the desktop computer market in the early 1990s, in which bigger players in the market lowered the prices of their systems far below what smaller firms like Cumulus could afford to compete against. This, combined with computer companies under-performing in the stock market in 1992, compelled Cumulus to rescind their initial public offering. This had the effect of exacerbating their cash flow dilemma, and with the planned retirement of their growing debt to lenders and suppliers foiled by the lack of liquidity that their IPO would have offered, Cumulus quickly became insolvent. Over the summer of 1992, the company canceled plans to move into a larger 165,000-square-foot office in Solon, Ohio, and in September 1992, Cumulus furloughed 170 workers in production and management—laying them off entirely the following week.

Four of Cumulus' creditors had filed suit against the company by late September 1992. Arrow Electronics, an electronic component distributor then headquartered in Melville, New York, claimed over $635,000 in unpaid invoices for parts and $1 million in punitive damages. J.B. Enterprises, a clothing supplier in Cleveland, sought a little over $16,000 in unpaid T-shirts. Conner Peripherals claimed $2 million in unpaid bills and punitive damages for liability and breach of contract; Cumulus denied those punitive damages in a prospectus. Interconnect Technical Services, an executive recruiting firm out of Toledo, sought $18,750 in payment for arranging an employee to work for Cumulus. In October 1992, Transcend Information sued Cumulus, seeking over $87,000 in payments. In November 1992, three more of Cumulus' creditors filed suit over non-payments: PerCom Technology of Fremont, California, for over $323,000; Toshiba America Information Systems for over $216,000; and Toshiba America Electronic Components for over $37,000. Although Cumulus hired a local consulting firm specializing in struggling businesses back in September, by November it became known through ex-employees that Star Banc of Cincinnati—a secured lender whom Cumulus owed $9 million—was in talks with the Cumulus to liquidate the company.

I consider [Martin Alpert] to be an authentic business genius with the capacity to build two highly successful, high-technology companies. He just lacked a sense of timing.

— Michael Blumberg, speaking of Cumulus' financial troubles in 1992

In October 1992, Cumulus sold their memory products division to Repco Electronics of Solon for an undisclosed amount. The resulting joint venture was named Cumulus Memory Products; Repco president Michael Blumberg accorded presidency of Cumulus Memory to Leonard Applebaum, previously the chairman of CAM/RPC, an electronic components distributor based in Highland Heights. Blumberg and Applebaum planned to rehire 25 to 50 of Cumulus' laid-off employees. Cumulus Memory, which had won its former parent company $45 million in sales in 1991, had its headquarters located within CAM/RPC's Highland Heights office, and by November, it had recovered 27 of Cumulus' ex–employee base.

Cumulus, erstwhile under ownership of Star Banc as "crisis managers", moved its headquarters to a much smaller office in Beachwood, across the street from their former 37,500-square-foot building, in October 1992. After the move was completed, the company laid off half of its remaining workforce and was now down to 50 employees. In December 1992, Cumulus' remaining employees were laid off. In January 1993, three more creditors filed suit against Cumulus for unpaid shipments of products: Western Digital for $1.1 million, Hyundai Electronics for $1 million, and Oki for more than $883,000. Following these suits, Cumulus plead to the Cuyahoga County Common Pleas Court to appoint a receiver to liquidate the company. The courts approved liquidation between January and March 1993, and Cumulus filled for Chapter 11 bankruptcy in turn. In early March, eighty of Cumulus' former employees filed a class action suit against Star Banc, claiming $236,000 in garnished wages and backpay for unused vacation time during Star Banc's management of Cumulus. Cumulus finally dissolved on April 1, 1993, with an auction supervised by Cleveland-based Rosen & Company of the company's 280 personal computers and thousands of peripherals.
