= Apricot VX FT =

PC-compatible computer made by Apricot

VX FT
- Cover story in Byte (September 1989) featuring the VX FT
- Codename: Titan
- Also known as: FTs
- Developer: Apricot Computers
- Manufacturer: Apricot Computers
- Product family: VX
- Type: Server
- Released: 31 May 1989; 37 years ago
- Availability: December 1989
- CPU: i386 at 25 MHz; i486 at 25 MHz
- Memory: 1–16 MB SIMMs
- Storage: Up to 5×1 GB SCSI hard disk drives
- Graphics: Video Graphics Array
- Dimensions: 62.5 by 62.5 by 41 centimetres (24.6 by 24.6 by 16.1 in)
- Weight: 75 kilograms (165 lb)
- Backward compatibility: IBM Personal System/2
- Predecessor: VX
- Website: mitsubishi-computers.com (archived 9 October 1999)

The VX FT, later rebranded as the FTs, is a computer released by Apricot Computers in late 1989. The VX FT was the first complete computer system to ship with Intel's i486 processor. Intended as a fault-tolerant file server, the VX FT features five full-height drive bays accommodating up to 5 GB of hard disk space, eight Micro Channel expansion slots (making it one of few PS/2 clones), a built-in uninterruptible power supply, and up to 16 MB of RAM.

== Background and development ==
Development of the VX FT was led by Peter Horne, the director of research and development at Apricot Computers. The VX FT borrows its name from the earlier VX series of file servers introduced in early 1987. Apricot expanded the original VX line in 1988 with the VX 9000 series. Whereas the VX line comprised relatively small floor-standing tower units intended as back-office servers, the VX 9000 were badge-engineered versions of Sequent Computer Systems's Symmetry line of large symmetric multiprocessing (SMP) computer systems. These were intended for heavy-duty number crunching, with the highest-end entry in the VX 9000 range supported up to 10 of Intel's i386 processors running in parallel. All VX 9000 systems ran UNIX System V. Horne's team took three months to develop the VX FT (the "FT" standing for "Fault Tolerant"), basing the design on their Qi family of workstations. The VX FT was designed to replace the original VX line, with Apricot positioning it between the Qi and the VX 9000, both of which continued to be sold.

The VX FT's design was rendered by Bob Cross, Apricot's house designer who was responsible for all the company's systems since 1983's Apricot PC. It bears a strong resemblance to the Qi. However, whereas the Qi is a desktop, the VX FT is a much larger tower unit, following in the footsteps of the original VX line. Manufacture of the VX FT was performed at Apricot's factory in Scotland, with assistance by Mitsubishi Electric, a Japanese electronics conglomerate who had invested in Apricot years before. Mitsubishi Electric went on to acquire Apricot Computers in April 1990.

== Specifications ==
The VX FT measures 62.5 by 62.5 by 41 centimetres (24.6 by 24.6 by 16.1 in) and weighs 75 kilograms (165 lb). Much of VX FT's weight comes from the dual 12-amp lead–acid batteries that constitute the uninterruptible power supply built into the system, included to make the system fault-tolerant. The UPS is loosely coupled to the main PSU and can be disabled with a switch on the back. The main PSU is a heavy-duty 465-watt unit with surge protection. The VX FT includes two handles on the top to make lifting the system easier, and the system rests on sleds on the base of the unit that allow for the system to be finely positioned back and forward in situ, as needed. Casters were considered but omitted from the final design due to safety concerns, and the VX FT's official documentation recommends a team lift when moving the system.

The VX FT's motherboard, which measures 36 by 38 centimetres (14 by 15 in), is a highly modified and physically extended version of the Qi's motherboard, featuring eight expansion slots, four more than the Qi, and a CPU daughtercard that plugs into an i386 socket. This daughtercard features an i486 processor—at the time Intel's newest flagship x86 CPU, unveiled in April 1989—clocked at 25 MHz. Apricot also sold the VX FT in a variant with a 25-MHz i386 installed directly on the socket as a lower-cost option. The VX FT supports up to 16 MB of RAM on Apricot's proprietary double-decker SIMMs that connect to a bank of slots on the motherboard. However, as these Apricot SIMMs were expensive and hard to find third-party, the slots also accept standard 80-ns 2 MB SIMMs for a total of 8 MB.

Like the Qi, the VX FT's expansion cards use the Micro Channel bus standard. Apricot licensed Micro Channel from IBM, who invented the bus for their PS/2 range of personal computers, making the VX FT (and the Qi) a PS/2 clone. Four of these slots hold 32-bit MCA cards while the other four hold 16-bit MCA cards. One of the 16-bit slots has an extension for specialised video cards; Apricot sold one such card with Chips and Technologies's high-performance 452 Super VGA controller, which works in tandem with the standard VGA controller on board (also made by C&T) to deliver higher-resolution, SVGA video modes.

Apricot envisioned the VX FT primarily as a file server. To this end, the system features five full-height drive bays. With the system's built-in SCSI host adapter card, manufactured by Adaptec, the computer can fit up to five 1-GB hard disk drives, giving the computer a total of 5 GB of disk storage. Apricot also optioned the VX FT with a tape drive for data backups. Apricot offered customers three options for a tape drive: a 3M DC2000 drive that runs off the floppy disk controller, for up to 80 MB of storage (albeit with slow seek times because of the FDC); an AccuTrak drive by Irwin Magnetics that runs off the SCSI host adapter for faster seek times and up to 150 MB of storage; and a SCSI-based DAT/DDS drive by Hewlett-Packard for up to 1.2 GB of disk storage and took up a full-height drive bay (unlike the former two tape drives, which occupied half of a drive bay). The drives are concealed behind a motorised drive door, which slides open with the push of a button below the Microscreen—a two-line, backlit LCD with five software-controlled buttons that allow users to open the drive bay doors, power off the system, reset the system; put the system into standby, and put the system into maintenance mode.

Consistent with its intended use as a file server, the motherboard of the VX FT integrates an Ethernet controller, with ports on the back for both thick or thin Ethernet. Alternatively, users could have purchased the VX FT with a Token Ring network card. The back of the VX FT also features a standard parallel port, a bidirectional parallel port, an RS-232 serial port, PS/2 mouse and keyboard ports, and a VGA connector for the built-in video adapter.

A pin tumbler lock on the back of the VX FT serves as basic access control to the inside of the system. Apricot also sold the VX FT with an optional security package, called the Qi Environment, for more robust access control. This package includes an infrared remote and a master setup disk that manages access to the server's features. To gain entry, users aim the infrared card at the sensor on the unit and input a code after clicking. Security breaches trigger distinct alarms based on the type of unauthorised access. The system's adaptable security allows for actions like automatically shutting off the network connection outside of business hours while still allowing scheduled backups. It also provides the ability to control disk drives and the eight expansion slots. The setup disk stores the menu-driven security settings; users who lost it without a backup had to contact Apricot for a replacement.

== Release ==
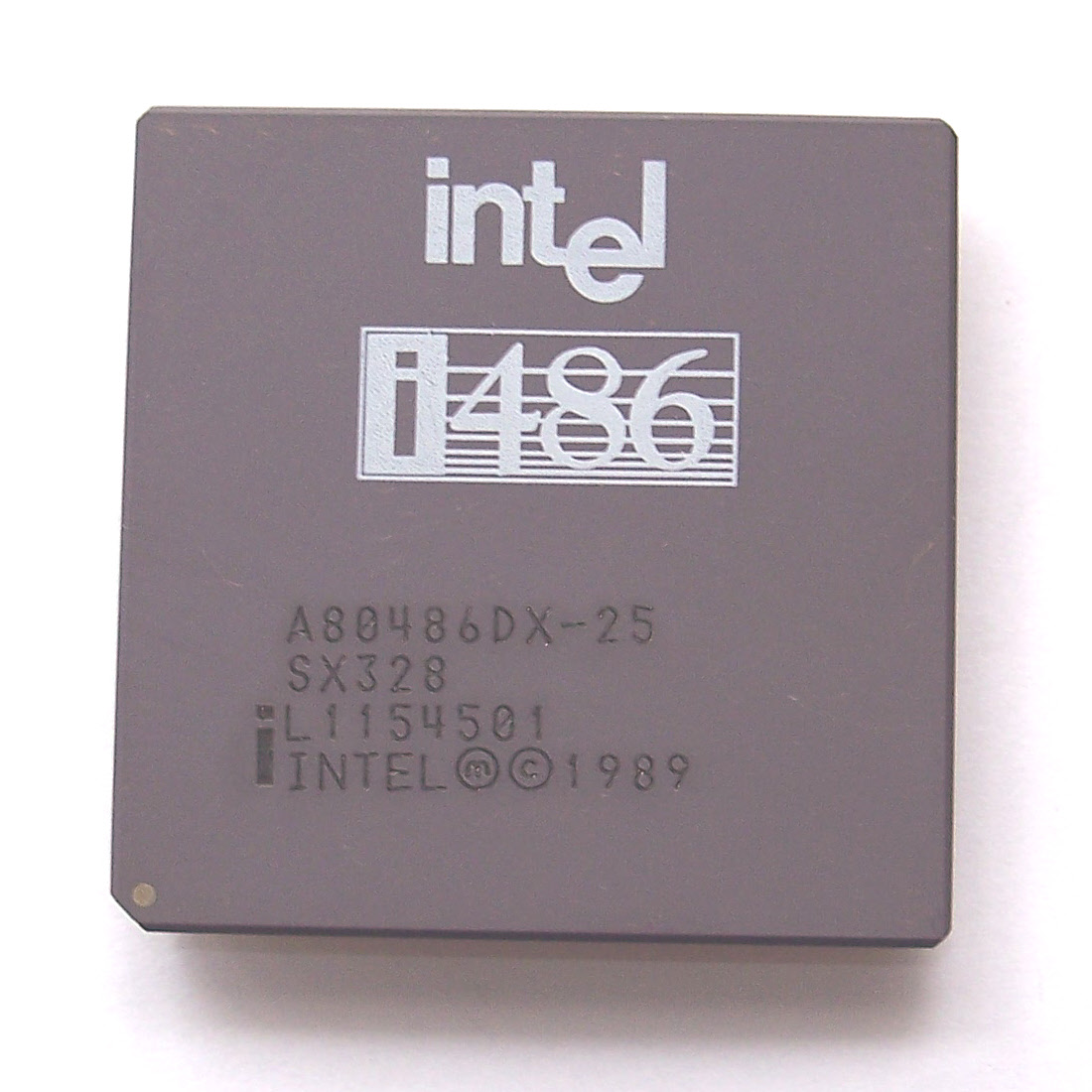
The VX FT was the first complete computer system with a i486 processor (pictured) ever sold.

Apricot officially unveiled the VX FT on 31 May 1989, barely over a month after Intel introduced the i486 processor. The VX FT was the first announced product to use the i486, Apricot beating IBM's announcement of the 486/25 Power Platform, a CPU upgrade card for their PS/2 Model 70 386, in June 1989 by three weeks. Within a day of its announcement, Apricot signed several deals with businesses for evaluation units of the VX FT, and in September 1989, Byte featured it on the front cover of that month's issue, the magazine proclaiming it as the world's first 486 machine.

IBM retaliated by making the first shipments of the 486/25 Power Platform, ahead of release of the VX FT, during the first week of October 1989, just as Intel released the first production batches of the i486. Although the 486/25 Power Platform became the first commercially available hardware product using the i486, IBM issued a recall after Intel publicly acknowledged a calculation bug in early batches of the i486, following rumours earlier that month. They resumed shipments in early December 1989, after Intel had corrected the bug in further batches of the i486. Apricot made their first permanent sale of the VX FT during the first week of December 1989, when they delivered two units to the offices of Fuel Oils Ltd in both London and Kent. In late December 1989, IBM followed suit with their own prebuilt i486 PC, the IBM PS/2 Model 70 486—a version of the PS/2 Model 70 386 with the 486/25 Power Platform pre-installed.

In November 1989, Apricot announced a SMP version of the VX FT featuring dual 25-MHz i486 processors. It was slated for a May 1990 release but did not see release until June 1991, at which point the VX FT was rebranded as the FTs. Because of its niche business application and high price tag—£14,780 in 1989 (equivalent to £41,147 in 2025) at the low end—sales of the VX FT and FTs were slow.

== Reception ==
Reviewing a nearly finished preproduction unit, Paul Lavin of PC User wrote that, based on a battery of synthetic benchmarks, "[t]he results were sufficient to propel the VX FT server to the rarefied reaches of the PC User pantheon of IBM-compatible greats. As the PC User benchmarks are disk-centric, the VX FT server beats the IBM Model 70 486, all of the current crop of 33 MHz PCs, and gives the DPT-equipped ... speedsters a run for their money". In a joint review with Michael Nadeau in Byte, Lavin and Nadeau concluded that, while "not perfect" due to a lack of hardware disk caching leading to slow access times and overheating in the early i486 batches, "[w]ith the 80486 VX FT prices starting at $18,000, Apricot is competing with both PC-based workstations and low-end minicomputers. Considering its performance, its security features, and the number of users it can serve, the VX FT Server should be a cost-efficient alternative to those systems".

== See also ==
- Compaq Deskpro 386, the first computer system with an i386 processor released the to public
- Tandy 5000 MC, the first PS/2 clone
