= First Class Peripherals =

American computer hardware manufacturer

- Type: Private
- Traded as: First Class Systems (1989–1990)
- Industry: Computer
- Founded: October 1984; 41 years ago in Bethlehem, Pennsylvania, United States
- Founders: Jim Toreson; Clinton B. Teegardin
- Defunct: November 1990; 35 years ago
- Fate: Dissolution
- Products: Peripherals; Systems
- Number of employees: 40 (1989)
- Parent: Xebec Corporation (1984–1989)

First Class Peripherals, Inc., was an American computer hardware manufacturer active from 1984 to 1990. First Class was initially a mail-order subsidiary of Xebec Corporation that produced HDD subsystems for the Apple II, the Macintosh, and the IBM PC and compatibles. After Xebec dissolved in 1989, First Class was spun off and relocated to Santa Clara, California, where it briefly existed as a manufacturer of clones of IBM's PS/2 under the trade name First Class Systems. It went defunct in November 1990.

== History ==
First Class Peripherals was founded in Bethlehem, Pennsylvania, in October 1984. It was formed as a subsidiary of Xebec Corporation, a computer hardware company based in Silicon Valley that was a top player in the hard disk drive and disk controller markets in the early 1980s. Jim Toreson, the co-founder and chairman of Xebec, poached Clinton B. Teegardin, a 20-year veteran executive of IBM, to lead the company while also being named a vice president of Xebec. The impetus for First Class' foundation was to dominate in the field of mail-order aftermarket computer hardware products, where rival disk drive manufacturers like Iomega had found commercial success.

The company's first product was an external hard disk drive subsystem for the Apple II family (excluding the Apple IIc). Called the Sider, it featured a 10-MB HDD manufactured by Xebec and was compatible with Apple DOS, ProDOS, Apple Pascal, and various distributions of CP/M for the Apple II. It was capable of being daisy-chained to a second Sider to expand the total storage capacity of the Apple II system. Introduced in December 1984, the Sider received positive reviews in the technology press and was named inCider's product of the month for May 1985. inCider praised its performance for its price bracket, although it had qualms about the drive's ability as a backup device. By September 1985, First Class had introduced a version of the Sider for the IBM Personal Computer and its compatibles. Unlike the Apple II version, the PC Sider received a mixed assessment by the press. In November 1985, First Class introduced the Sider II, a successor to the Apple II version featuring a faster 20-MB HDD. The Sider II was succeeded by the 40-MB D4 in 1988.

By the end of 1985, First Class had relocated to Carson City, Nevada, to be closer to Xebec's primary manufacturing plant. In 1987, it began to branch out from just HDD subsystems to various computer peripherals, starting with tape drives for Apple's Macintosh family of computers. Its parent company Xebec was by this point in dire financial straits after its previously lucrative disk controller business began to crumble after it lost IBM as a customer. In October 1988, Xebec signed a deal with Migent Software of Incline Village, Nevada, to remarket the latter's Pocket Modem as the First Class Travel Modem. This was part of a debt repayment deal; per a Nevada judgement, Migent owed $163,000 to Xebec, whom Migent hired as a contract manufacturer for the company's modems.

Employment at First Class hovered at 40 in mid-1989. In July 1989, Xebec folded after filing Chapter 7 bankruptcy and having its assets liquidated. First Class Peripherals was spun off into a separate company, which continued to operate. Toreson, the ex-principle of Xebec, was named First Class' chairman, relocating the company to Santa Clara, California. Over the summer of 1989, Toreson secured funding and technical assistance from Voxson of Italy and Normerel of France to pivot from computer peripherals to complete computer systems. It was rebranded First Class Systems and focused exclusively on marketing clones of IBM's PS/2 family of personal computers, which used the proprietary Micro Channel architecture. Such clones were rare, especially by an American company. In November 1989, First Class Systems made their market debut with the F20DX and the F16/SX, workalikes of the PS/2 Model 70 and the PS/2 Model 55 SX respectively. First Class catered largely to pre-existing customers of PS/2s and achieved modest sales by February 1990. In April 1990, it introduced the 325i, another workalike of the PS/2 Model 70 increasing the clock speed from 20 MHz to 25 MHz.

Responding to the slow adoption rate of MCA in the broader PC market, First Class' insisted in 1990 that MCA was "like front-engine cars ... Nobody wanted one until industry leaders started producing them" and that systems based on MCA would eventually "prov[e] their worth". In spite of their plans to expand, First Class dissolved in November 1990 when it was suspended from the Franchise Tax Board of California.
