= Joseph Segel =

American entrepreneur (1931–2019)

- Born: January 9, 1931; Philadelphia, Pennsylvania, U.S.
- Died: December 21, 2019 (aged 88); Gladwyne, Pennsylvania, U.S.
- Education: Wharton School of the University of Pennsylvania
- Occupation: Entrepreneur
- Known for: Founder of American television network QVC

Joseph Myron Segel (January 9, 1931 – December 21, 2019) was an American entrepreneur. He was the founder of over 20 American companies, most notably QVC, an American television network, and the Franklin Mint, a producer of mail-order collectibles. Segel was named to the Direct Marketing Association's Hall of Fame in 1993. He was honored with a Lifetime Achievement Award from the Electronic Retailing Association and an honorary doctorate from Drexel University.

He was awarded the Philip H. Ward, Jr. Medal from The Franklin Institute in 1977. In 2005, the Harvard Business School published their selection of The Greatest Business Leaders of the Twentieth Century. Then, in 2007, the Wharton School of the University of Pennsylvania published their selection of The Most Influential Wharton Alumni and Faculty in the Wharton School's 125-year history. Segel was one of only 10 people who was on both of these lists.

== Early life ==
Born to a Jewish family, Segel, at the age of 13, started a successful printing business. At 16, he entered the Wharton School of the University of Pennsylvania in Philadelphia. In 1951 he received a Bachelor of Science degree in Economics.

== Career ==
As a graduate student, he taught introductory marketing classes while running the Advertising Specialty Institute, his first significant business venture. The company published a centralized directory of promotional materials and their suppliers.

=== Franklin Mint ===
In 1964, Segel took note of two concurrent events: the passing of General Douglas MacArthur and people lining up at banks to buy up the last U.S. silver dollars. In response, he founded the National Commemorative Society, which introduced a monthly series of limited edition, sterling silver commemorative coin-like medals. Later that year, dissatisfied with the quality of the coin-medals produced by a subcontractor, he recruited Gilroy Roberts, then Chief Engraver of the U.S. Mint, to join him in starting the General Numismatics Corporation. GNC became the Franklin Mint in 1965, shortly after going public. The Franklin Mint quickly expanded to produce not only coin-like medals and casino tokens, but other collectibles, including car models, luxury board-game editions and porcelain dolls.

Segel retired as chairman of Franklin Mint Corporation in 1973.

=== National Software Testing Laboratories ===
Segel founded the National Software Testing Laboratories aka NSTL in 1983. The company published several monthly newsletters including "Software Digest". The publications were often subscribed by IT departments of major corporations, as a basis to evaluate and consider products for their company. PC Hardware and software publishers often contracted the company to perform compatibility and performance tests. NSTL passed through a series of owners, including publisher McGraw-Hill, before being acquired by Intertek in 2007.

=== Public service ===
In 1971, Segel was elected chairman of the Board of Governors of the United Nations Association of the USA. Two years later, President Gerald Ford appointed him as a member of the U.S. Delegation to that year's United Nations General Assembly, where he served under Henry Kissinger. He also organized a national campaign of the Advertising Council to improve public understanding of the United Nations, chaired a national conference on the United Nations for the American Society of Newspapers Editors and testified in support of the United Nations before the U.S. Senate Foreign Relations Committee. In 1986 he wrote a letter to The New York Times in defense of Secretary-General Kurt Waldheim's recently discovered service as a Wehrmacht intelligence officer during WWII.

=== QVC ===
In 1986, Segel decided to start QVC ("Quality Value Convenience") after watching a videotape of the Home Shopping Network. Immediately, he identified many potential improvements, from the items offered for sale to their presentation. To lend credibility to the new company, QVC made a two-year deal to sell Sears products. He raised over $20 million in capital, including support from Ralph Roberts, the founder and chairperson of Comcast. Roberts was able to arrange deals in which cable companies received investment stakes in QVC in exchange for carrying the channel. Fifty-eight cable systems in twenty states signed on for the 7:30 pm to 12:00 midnight broadcast, giving it an audience of 7.6 million TV homes for its November 24 launch. Publicly offered at $10 on September 5, 1986, QVC stock closed its first trading day at $20 per share, even though its first broadcast was months away.

Joseph Segel retired from QVC in 1993, but remained involved in the network until 2013 in an advisory role.

== Death ==
Segel died on December 21, 2019, at the age of 88 in Gladwyne, Pennsylvania, from congestive heart failure.
