= Compaq Deskpro 386 =

PC compatible computers made by Compaq

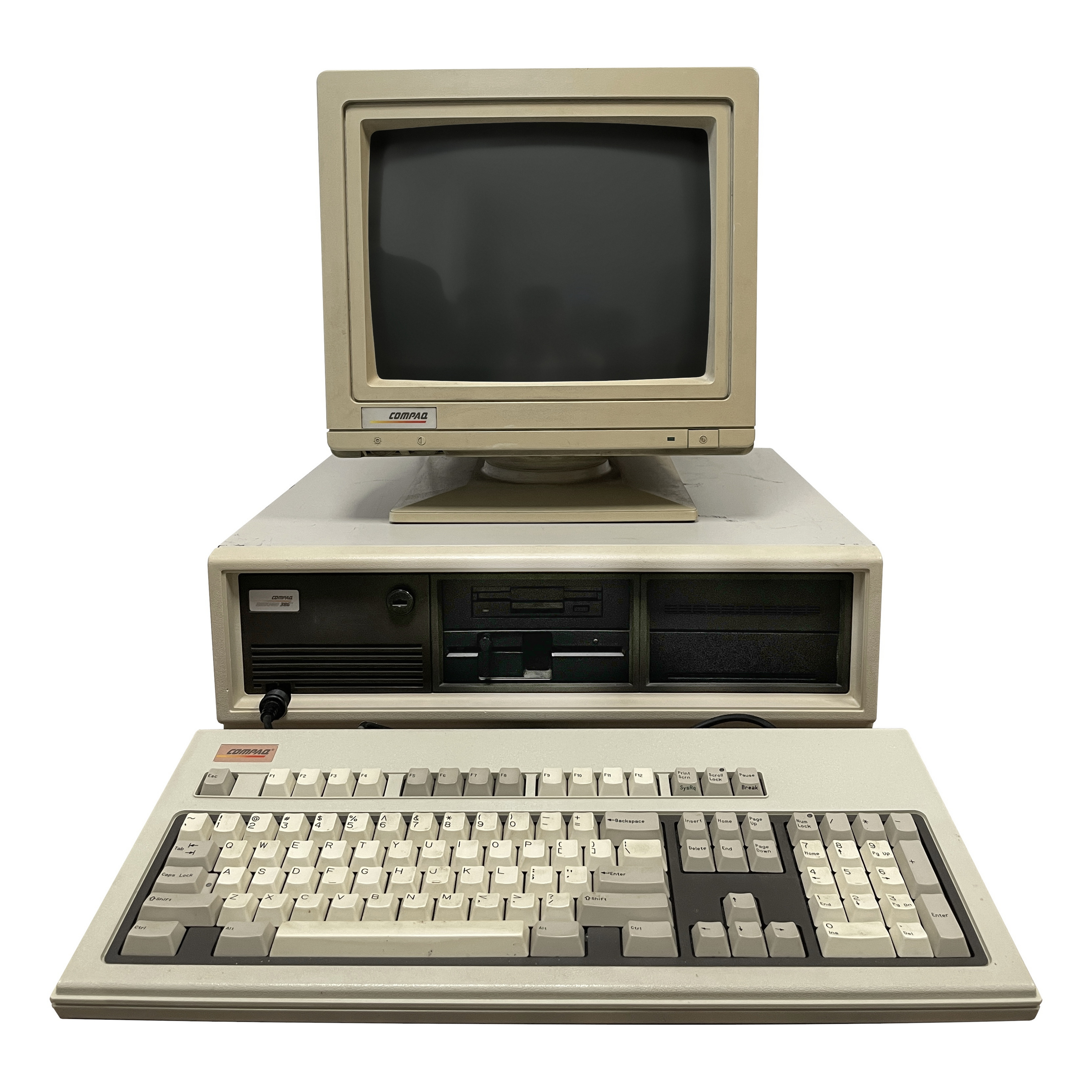
- A Deskpro 386 with monitor and peripherals; the Deskpro 386 was the first personal computer to feature an 80386 microprocessor.
- Developer: Compaq
- Manufacturer: Compaq
- Product family: Deskpro
- Type: Desktop computer
- Released: September 9, 1986; 40 years ago
- CPU: Intel 80386 running at 16 MHz
- Memory: 1–16MiB RAM (32-bit)

The Deskpro 386 is a line of desktop computers in Compaq's Deskpro range of IBM PC compatibles. Introduced in September 1986, the Deskpro 386 was the first personal computer to feature Intel's 32-bit 80386 microprocessor. It also marks the first time that a major component of the IBM Personal Computer de facto standard was updated by a company other than IBM; in this case, upgrading from the 80286 processor of the Personal Computer/AT.

The initial models of the Deskpro 386 were developed by a team of 250 people, led by Gary Stimac. It was released to high praise in the technology press and widespread adoption in enterprise and scientific engineering. Compaq continued releasing updated models of the Deskpro 386 as newer revisions of the 386 chip were introduced by Intel.

== Specifications ==
The Deskpro 386 line features the Industry Standard Architecture (ISA) bus identical to that of the IBM Personal Computer/AT. While the Personal Computer/AT has a 16-bit Intel 80286 microprocessor, the Deskpro 386 features Intel's 32-bit 80386 processor. The initial three models in the Deskpro 386 line—the Deskpro 386 Model 40, the Deskpro 386 Model 70, and the Deskpro 386 Model 130—differ only in the storage capacity of the included hard disk drives and in the number of ISA expansion slots on their motherboards. The models otherwise all come with at least 1 MB of RAM and a 16-MHz Intel 80386 microprocessor. The Model 40 is equipped with a 40 MB ESDI hard drive and features six ISA expansion slots—three 8-bit slots and three 16-bit slots. The Models 70 and 130 are equipped with 70 MB and 130 MB ESDI hard drives, respectively; both feature five expansion slots—three 8-bit slots and two 16-bit slots. Externally, the design of the Deskpro 386's case is identical to that of its predecessors, the original 8088-equipped Deskpro and the 80286-equipped Deskpro 286. Each model of the Deskpro 386 features four 5.25-inch half-height drive bays, and all models are equipped stock with one 1.2-MB 5.25-inch floppy drive. The hard drives in the Models 40 and 70 are half-height units, while the Model 130's hard drive is a full-height unit.

Instead of integrating memory on the motherboards, Compaq put the RAM chips on a daughtercard that plugs into a 32-bit bus slot on the motherboard. This slot is bespoke to the Deskpro 386 and allows the transfer of information to and from the bus in 32-bit words. For the initial models, the daughtercard carries 1 MB of RAM stock, and can be expanded to take up to 2 MB (half of its RAM sockets are unpopulated). The daughtercard itself contains a slot that can hold a special "piggyback" card that carries 4 MB of RAM stock, upgradable up to 8 MB. The highest amount of RAM that Compaq offered in this daughtercard-and-piggyback-card arrangement on the initial release of the Deskpro 386 was 10 MB. Additional RAM may be installed as upgrade cards in any of the 16-bit ISA expansion slots—with the understanding that this imposes a speed bottleneck because of the ISA's 16-bit data path.

== Development ==
Although the 80286 was available for some time before IBM's introduction of the PC AT, other companies including Compaq believed they had to wait for IBM to set the standard before releasing in 1985 their own AT clones, such as the Deskpro 286. Although the PC AT and PC DOS did not fully use the 80286's power, the repeated failures of companies that attempted to significantly vary from IBM's designs discouraged others from trying.

By mid-1986 IBM had not yet released a 80386-based computer. John C. Dvorak surmised that IBM was unwilling to use the CPU as doing so might cannibalize profits of its midrange computer offerings, including the System/36 and System/38. In January 1986 Compaq engineer Hugh Barnes told cofounder and CEO Rod Canion that, according to Intel engineers, IBM was not yet interested in using 80386. Hoping to become the PC technology leader, Canion contacted Intel president Andy Grove and offered to develop computer hardware using the processor.

The Deskpro 386 was developed in large part by Gary Stimac, Compaq's vice president of engineering and the company's fifth employee hired. Stimac led a team of people who eventually grew to 250 in the middle of 1986. Development of the Deskpro 386 was a close collaboration between Compaq, Intel, and Microsoft, who each signed a three-way non-disclosure agreement. The Deskpro 386 project officially commenced in March 1985, after Intel shared Compaq the first block diagram for the 80386 processor architecture. Stimac described this diagram as a listing of the 386's new and upgraded features, as well as a schedule of milestones for its development and eventual production runs. In June 1985, Intel delivered to Compaq detailed specifications of the 386, after which Compaq laid out a block diagram of future product lines to integrate the processor.

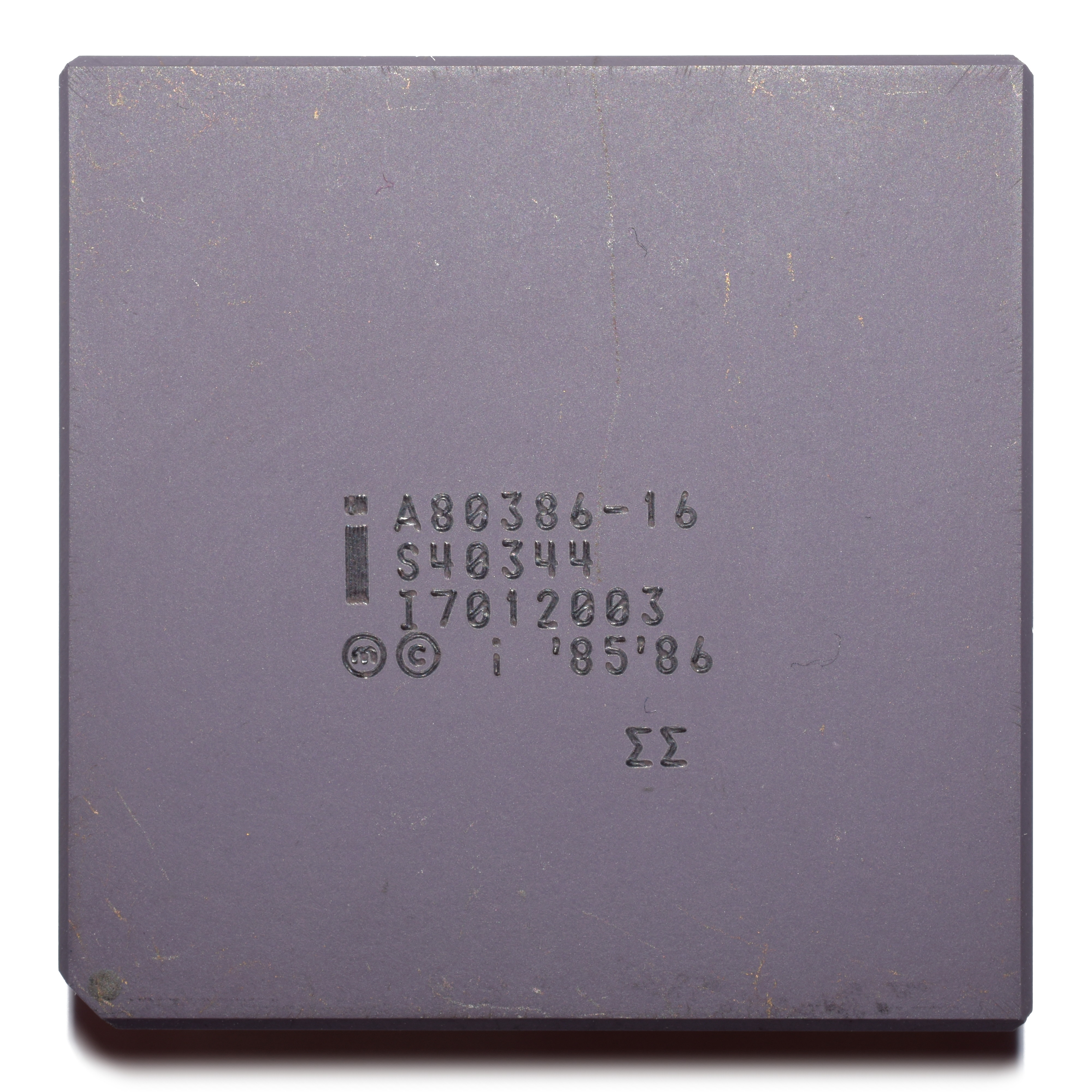
The Deskpro 386 was the first personal computer based on the 80386 processor (pictured) sold to the public.

The Deskpro 386 was the first implementation of the 80386 processor in a computer system for sale to the public. Compaq was aware that by introducing the Deskpro 386 first, a future IBM product might be incompatible with and obsolete it. Canion had said as early as December 1982, during a Boston Computer Society presentation, that IBM could not revert to proprietary computers without hurting itself. With Deskpro 386, the company again predicted that IBM would not greatly change the PC architecture as doing so would also orphan millions of real IBM PCs. PC wrote "Compaq's conclusion: IBM's DOS standard is now bigger than IBM". Although expecting IBM to become the leader in 386-based systems, Computerworld wrote that when the company did ship them "it must follow the installed base [and] the de facto industry standard for the 80386 market, a standard that no longer bears the name IBM".

Microsoft was brought on board as a consultant for potential software compatibility issues with the plethora of MS-DOS-based software on the market. As well, Compaq asked Microsoft what other operating systems they could provide that had better 32-bit support for the 386. By the time of the Deskpro's release, the most advanced operating system that Microsoft offered was Xenix System V/286, which Compaq offered as an optional pack-in for selecting buyers. A 32-bit version for the 386 was promised in the first quarter of 1987. The Deskpro 386 had the full support of Microsoft head Bill Gates. Gates recalled in 1997:

A big milestone [in the history of the personal computer industry] was that the folks at IBM didn't trust the 386. They didn't think it would get done. So we encouraged Compaq to go ahead and just do a 386 machine. That was the first time people started to get a sense that it wasn't just IBM setting the standards, that this industry had a life of its own, and that companies like Compaq and Intel were in there doing new things that people should pay attention to.

Early prototypes of the Deskpro 386 were designed around the 12-MHz clock speed of the earliest production batches of the 80386 and so featured a 6-MHz bus clock. By the time the Deskpro 386 came out, yields of 16-MHz 386's had reached acceptable numbers, and so the bus clock was upgraded to 8 MHz. Regarding RAM, four different paths were taken by Stimac's team to determine the best memory configuration for both performance and cost. A static-column DRAM design was chosen as the winner, against pure page mode DRAM, traditional asynchronous DRAM, and DRAM backed with cache. On the mass storage front, the use of SCSI hard drives was considered early on but abandoned due to a performance penalty incurred with SCSI drive controllers over the ISA bus. They found a vendor of ESDI drives that were able to put the controller hardware onto the drive itself, leading to acceptable performance.

== Release ==
Canion, Grove, and Intel's Gordon Moore announced the Deskpro 386 on September 9, 1986, concurrent with a formal announcement at a gala hosted at New York City. Gates attended, as did Compaq chairman Ben Rosen. The Model 40 retailed for US$6,499 (equivalent to $19,089), the Model 70 for $7,299, and the Model 130 for $8,799 (equivalent to $25,844).

Compaq's announcement surprised the media. Journalists immediately latched onto Compaq's status as a compatible maker revising a major component of the IBM Personal Computer de facto standard, while The Wall Street Journal wrote that, while relatively steep, the prices were set by Compaq "in the lower range of what industry analysts have been predicting such machines would cost". InfoWorld ran the headline on the cover page of their September 15, 1986, issue: "Compaq Introduces 386 PC, Challenges IBM to Match It". In the article, Canion was quoted warning IBM that they had six months to respond with a 386-based machine of their own lest they lose serious market share, while also attempting to quash uncertainty over the Deskpro 386's potential incompatibilities that IBM might try to convey. IBM eventually released their first 386-based PC—the Personal System/2 Model 80—in July 1987, nearly a year after the Deskpro 386's release.

== Sales ==
Despite overall sales of 386-based personal computers not ramping up until 1989, and many customers cautious about buying a computer in a market without an IBM product, Compaq had sold 25,000 units of the Deskpro 386 by February 1987. This was barely six months after its market introduction, which Dun's Business Month said represented "extraordinary acceptance" for an over-$6,500 computer based on a cutting-edge chip, with no operating system on the market natively supporting it yet. Journalist Laton McCartney wrote that the Deskpro 386 was popular among corporate executives and financial analysts who needed number-crunching power. Yankee Group and Dataquest had estimated at the Deskpro 386's announcement that Compaq would sell 35,000 to 70,000 units in 1987; during the second quarter of 1987, Compaq sold 90,000 units of the Deskpro 386, according to an industry analyst.

While IBM cut Model 80 prices because of slow sales "Compaqs are selling like crazy", a dealer told InfoWorld in January 1988, with higher margins encouraging retailers to give them more shelf space. Compaq reported selling out of the Deskpro 386 by the end of 1987, and in January 1988 that it was unable to fulfill the backlog until mid-1988. That year the lineup generated the most revenue out of any Compaq's product, despite the older Deskpro 286 actually outselling the Deskpro 386 in terms of quantity. By the time Compaq and other clone makers introduced the Extended Industry Standard Architecture in 1988, Compaq had 28% of the 386-based market compared to IBM's 16%.

== Reception and legacy ==
The Deskpro 386 was warmly received by the technology press. In InfoWorld, Stephen Satchell called it the "hottest IBM PC compatible now available. The Deskpro 386 is twice as fast as any AT-style machine we've tested, and its price is not out of line for such a powerful machine." Bill Howard and William Wong of PC Magazine summarized: "Well-built and exceptionally PC compatible, the first 386-based PC is a screamer. It makes most ATs look like slugs." Tom Hill of The Ottawa Citizen wrote that the result of its increased processing speed and fast hard drive "is a high-quality, quiet-running personal computer of unmatched performance and potential."

The New York Times wrote in 1989 that the Deskpro 386 established Compaq as the leader of the personal computer industry and "hurt no company more—in prestige as well as dollars—than [IBM]". In 2006 PC World called the Deskpro 386 the second greatest personal computer of all time, behind the original Apple II. The magazine wrote that the Deskpro 386 "wasn't just one of the most powerful, most popular PCs of its time—it was also compelling proof that the PC platform was far bigger than any one company". Wishing to avoid repeating the 386 delay, IBM became the first company to ship a commercial product based on the Intel 80486, the 486/25 Power Platform upgrade card to the IBM PS/2 Model 70, in October 1989.

== Later models ==
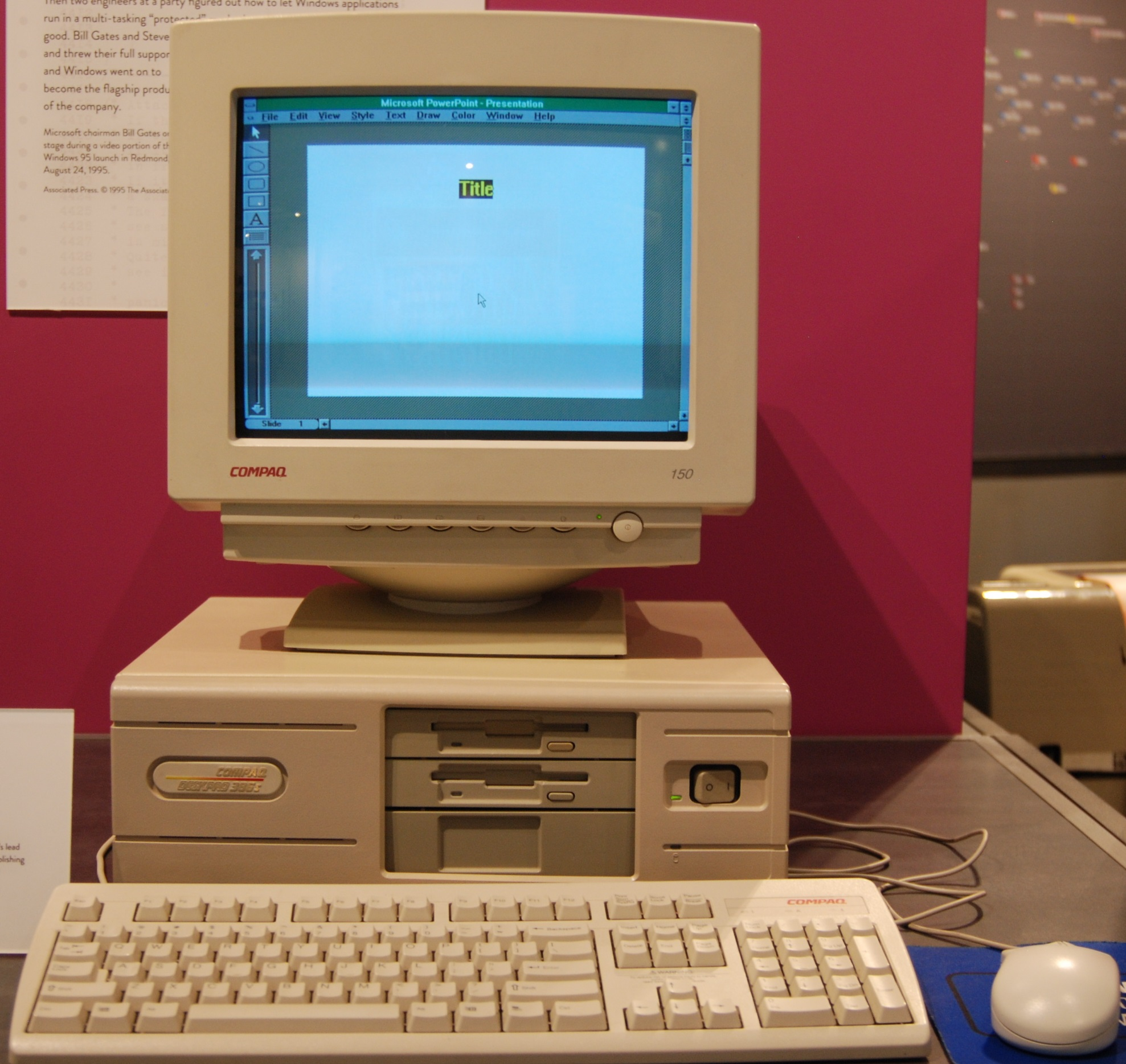
Deskpro 386S, later entry in the line featuring a 386SX processor

Compaq continued releasing updated models of the Deskpro 386 as newer revisions of the 386 chip were introduced by Intel. In 1987, the company released the Deskpro 386/20, based on the 20-MHz 386 and one of the first microcomputers to use that revision of the chip. It is the fastest IBM PC compatible that InfoWorld had reviewed up to that point, in November 1987.

In 1988, the company released the Deskpro 386/25 and the Deskpro 386S—the former based on the 25-MHz 386 and the latter based on Intel's lower-cost 386SX chip, which features a 16-bit data bus instead of a 32-bit one. The latter is the first personal computer based on the 386SX, while the former was described by InfoWorld as outperforming all systems reviewed up to that point, "and, like its 20-MHz predecessor, set[ting] a new performance standard for 386 computers", albeit at a steep price of US$10,000. The Deskpro 386s version was available on June 20, 1988.

One of the last entries in the Deskpro 386 line is the Deskpro 386n and Deskpro 386s/20n, which bear smaller, thinner cases (described by InfoWorld as "trimline") and 386SX processors. These Deskpros are intended for local-area networking and feature fewer expansion slots but were much lower-cost.

== See also ==
- Apricot VX FT, the first computer system to ship with the i486 processor, the successor to the 386
- Influence of the IBM PC on the personal computer market
