= NCP Engineering =

NCP engineering
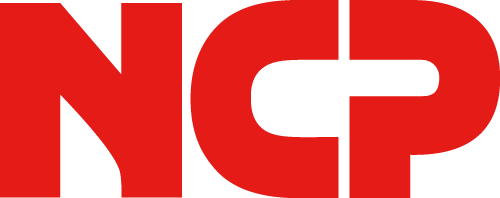

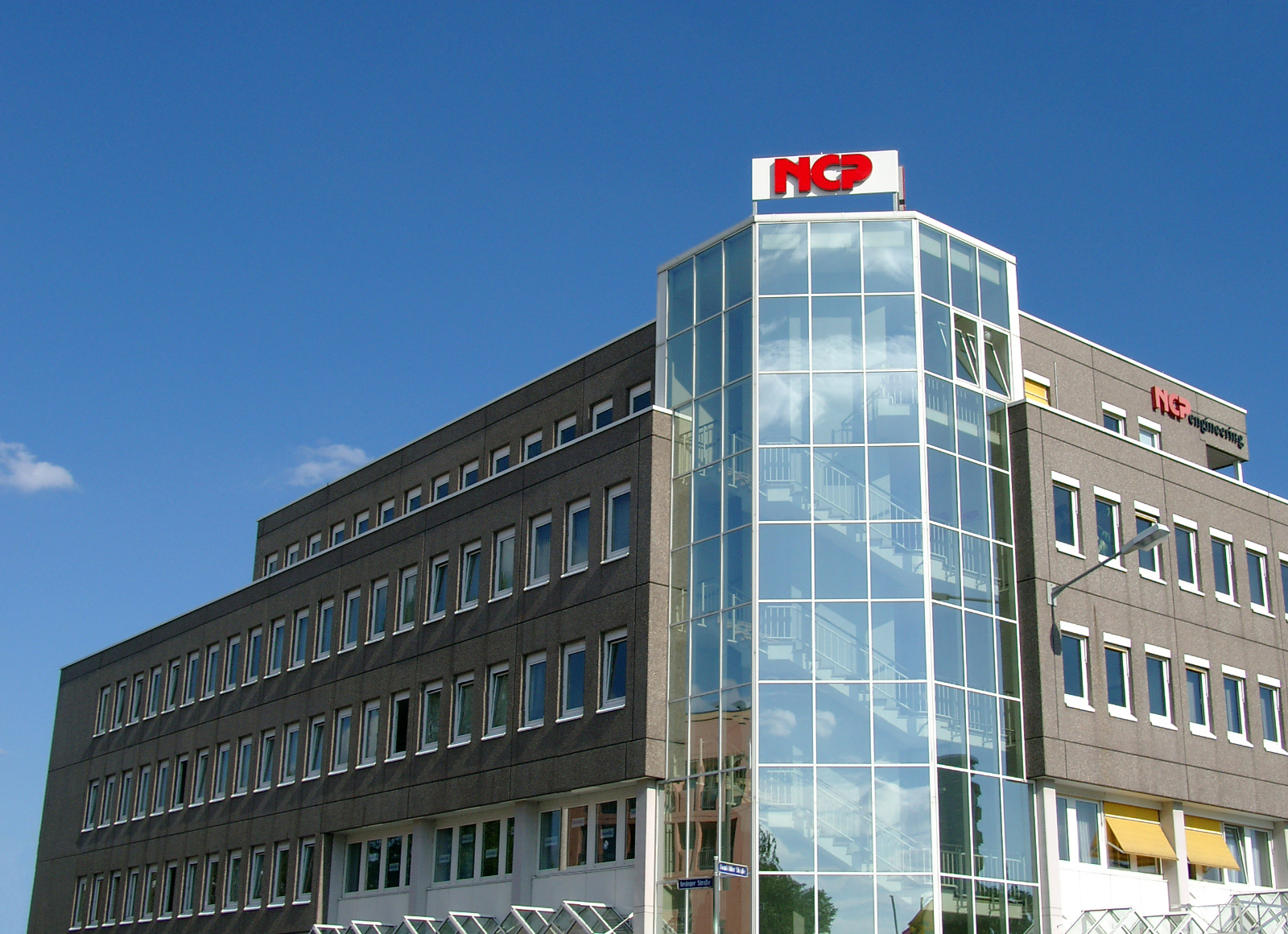
- NCP engineering company headquarters on Dombühler Straße in Nuremberg
- Type: Private
- Industry: Information technology
- Founded: 1986
- Headquarters: Nuremberg, Germany
- Key people: Peter Soell (managing director); Patrick Oliver Graf (managing director)
- Number of employees: 50+
- Subsidiaries: NCP engineering, Inc., Clearwater, Florida, USA
- Website: ncp-e.com

NCP engineering is a Nuremberg-based company producing software for remote access, industrial internet of things security and information security. NCP's products use virtual private network (VPN) and other technologies like encryption, personal firewalls and electronic certificates in a public key infrastructure (PKI) to secure data communication.

NCP has made its IPsec VPN client compatible with the Windows 10, Windows 11, iOS, macOS, Linux and Android operating systems.

== Name ==
NCP is the abbreviation of "Network Communications Products".

== History ==
In 2007, NCP partnered with WatchGuard Technologies.

In January 2010, NCP established a North American affiliate, NCP engineering, Inc.

In February 2010, NCP engineering was awarded US Patent 8811397 B2 for a "System and method for data communication between a user terminal and a gateway via a network node".

NCP engineering has been involved in the ESUKOM project for the development of real-time security in mobile device environments that protect corporate networks since 2010.

Juniper Networks and NCP engineering began a partnership in 2011 and intensified their collaboration in 2017 with an exclusive technology partnership.
