= National Software Testing Laboratories =

National Software Testing Laboratories (NSTL) was established by serial entrepreneur Joseph Segel in 1983 to test computer software. The company provides certification (such as WHQL and Microsoft Windows Mobile certification), quality assurance, and benchmarking services. NSTL was acquired by Intertek in 2007.
