= CPU card =

Printed circuit board that contains a central processing unit

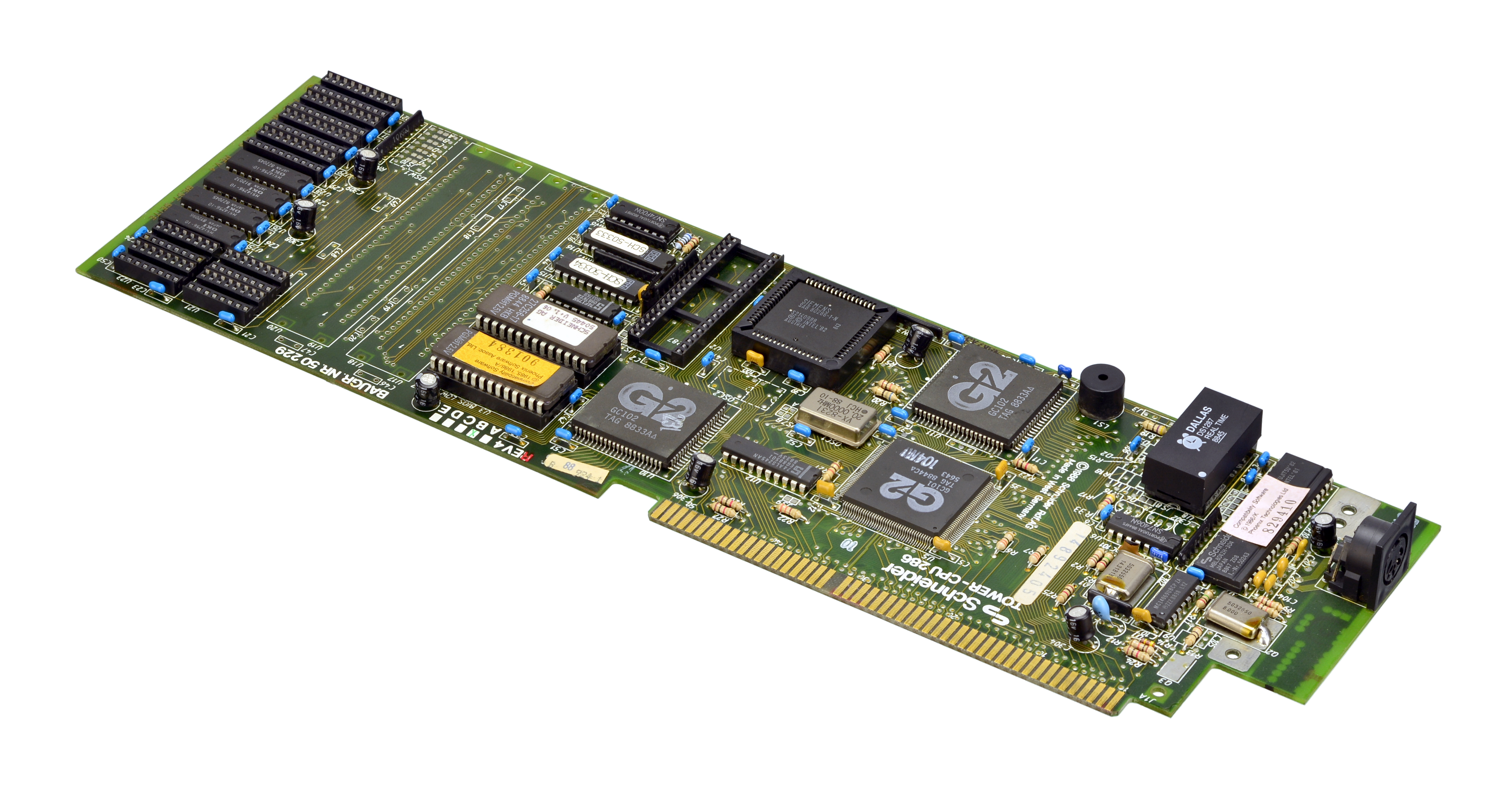
Schneider CPU board from 1988

A CPU card is a printed circuit board (PCB) that contains the central processing unit (CPU) of a computer. CPU cards are specified by CPU clock frequency and bus type as well as other features and applications built into the card.

CPU cards include Peripheral Component Interconnect (PCI) cards, modular PC Cards, Industry Standard Architecture (ISA) cards, PCI extensions for instrumentation (PXI) cards and embedded technology extended (ETX) cards. CPU cards are often used to expand the memory, speed, bandwidth or embedded applications of an existing computer system. PC cards are typically used to expand a system's embedded applications. PC cards include modules for audio and video applications, data communications and embedded storage. PXI cards are used for data acquisition and control systems, making them suitable for real-time measurement applications. ETX cards are used in industrial applications to augment a computer system's embedded applications. ETX cards contain all the functionality necessary to run the PC in a compact space.

CPU cards that are used to augment existing computer backplanes typically have ISA or PCI connectors and can be plugged into the backplane without any additional configuration. CPU cards for use in computer backplanes are typically half-sized. The CPU card contains the PC functionality and communicates with the other cards plugged into the backplane through a computer bus. CPU cards may also be called expansion cards or expansion boards, and offer a variety of embedded applications from modems and wireless networking to graphics and video controllers to RAID controllers.
