= Wangco =

American computer hardware company

Wangco, Inc.
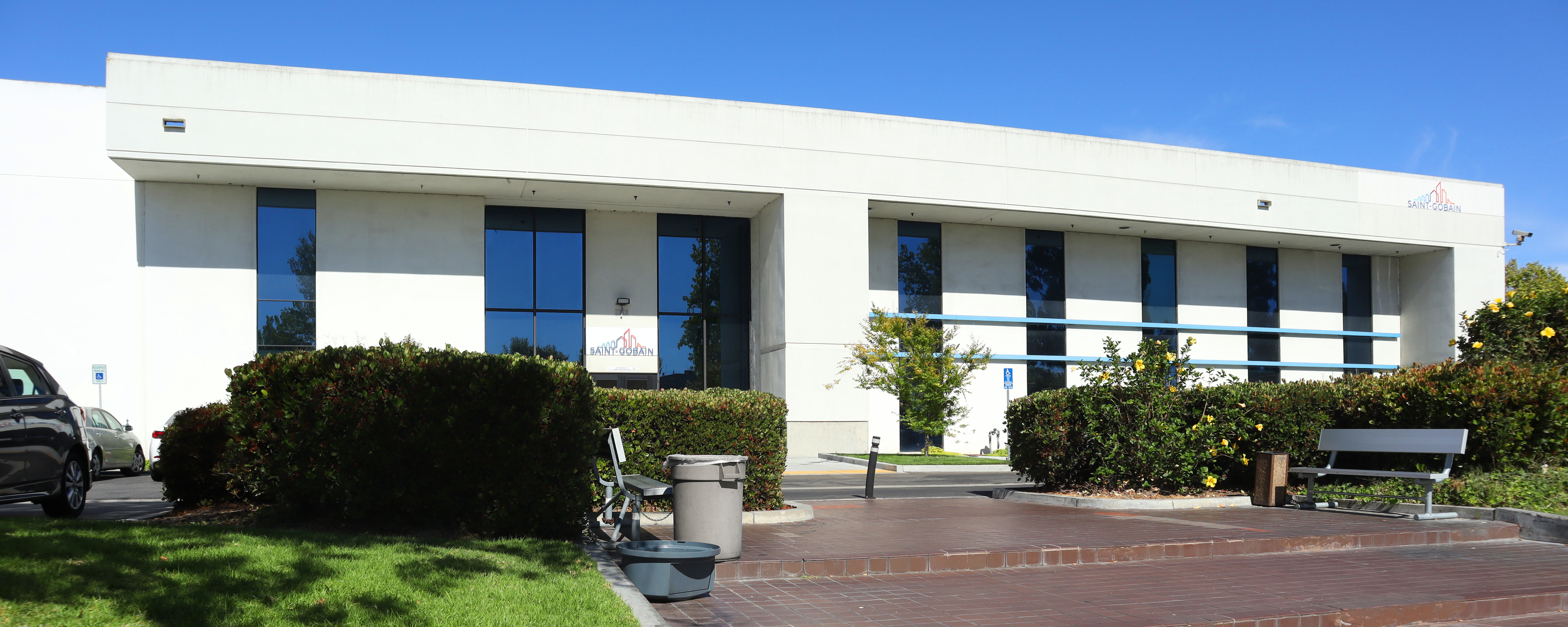
- Site of final headquarters in Garden Grove, California, now owned by Saint-Gobain, pictured in 2021
- Type: Public
- Industry: Computer hardware
- Founded: May 1969; 57 years ago in Santa Monica, California, United States
- Founder: Ben C. Wang
- Defunct: June 30, 1976; 50 years ago
- Fate: Acquired by Perkin-Elmer
- Headquarters: Marina del Rey, California (1973–1977); Garden Grove, California (since 1977)
- Products: Tape drives; Hard disk drives
- Number of employees: 650 (1976, peak)

Wangco, Inc., originally Wang Computer Products, Inc., was an American computer hardware company independently active from 1969 to 1976. It was founded in Los Angeles by the tape drive pioneer Ben C. Wang. At its peak in the mid-1970s, the company was the second-largest American manufacturer of tape drives and employed 650 workers. It was acquired by Perkin-Elmer in 1976.

== History ==
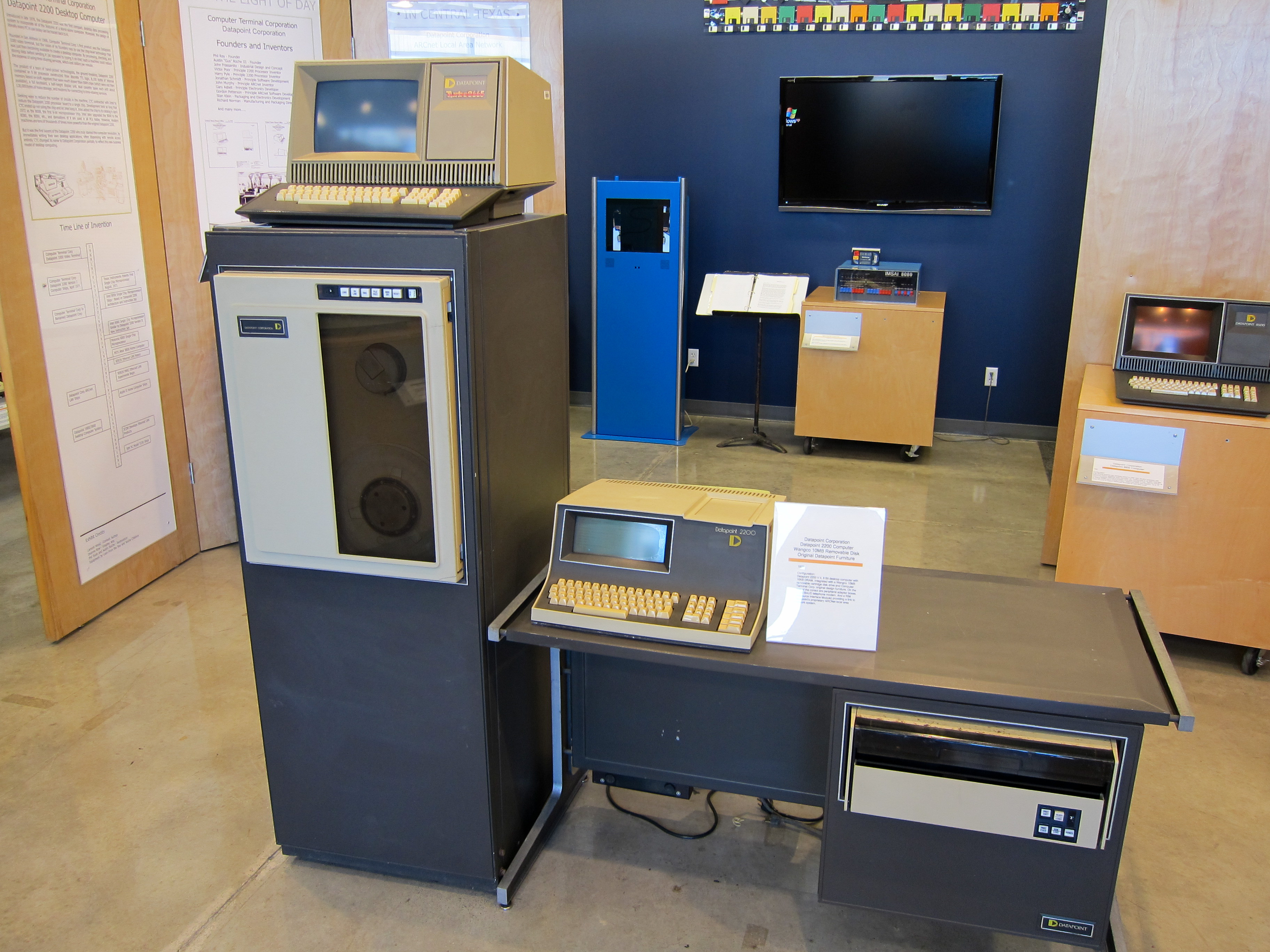
A 10-MB Wangco hard disk drive (bottom right) built into a Datapoint-branded desk with a Datapoint 2200 on top

Wangco, Inc., was founded as Wang Computer Products (WCP) by Ben C. Wang in Santa Monica, California, in May 1969. Wang had emigrated from Shanghai to San Francisco in 1947 at the age of 19, after working for a year as a deckhand on an American merchant vessel. After gaining a student visa in 1948 (vouched and funded for by his friends in the United States), Wang worked various odd jobs in Chinatown while attending the City College of San Francisco. He later earned a master's degree in mechanical engineering from the UC Berkeley College of Engineering and his PhD from the Illinois Institute of Technology. Upon earning his PhD in 1958, he planned to enter the American aerospace industry but could not obtain the necessary security clearance as a foreign national. Instead, he landed a job at IBM in New York, working for the company's peripheral division, where he helped develop IBM's disk and tape drive systems. In 1962, he quit IBM to work for Ampex in the San Francisco Bay Area, where he developed the first direct-driven, single-capstan tape drive on the market. Wang's design quickly became the de facto standard for tape drive design as it used fewer parts, thus saving on production costs.

Wang's tenure at Ampex proved short-lived because of the company's financial difficulty, and he left to work for Scientific Data Systems (SDS), a start-up company based in Santa Monica, in 1964. There, he developed peripherals under leadership of Max Palevsky, SDS's principal founder. Wang deeply admired Palevsky's leadership skills, and after five years at SDS, he left to found Wang Computer Products in Santa Monica with US$600,000 in start-up capital and $10,000 of his own money. WCP focused on the production of low-cost, midrange-oriented peripherals, plug-compatible with IBM's systems but designed to avoid direct competition with IBM's lineup. Wang targeted OEMs rather than end users, bypassing the need for equipment leasing and service bureaus. Wang's business model further minimized overhead by prioritizing established technologies over high-risk research and development and the pursuit of novel technologies.

Wangco was founded during a period of major expansion in the tape drive industry, whose growth outpaced that of the mainframe industry which it supported. It got a running start in the industry when IBM itself signed a contract with Wangco to supply IBM with Wangco's 9-track tape drives for some of IBM's midrange computers. The company's revenue grew rapidly, surging from $23,000 in 1970 to over $18 million in 1974. Within a few years of its incoporation, Wangco had gained Data General, General Electric, and Westinghouse as customers.

In May 1972, Wang Computer Products filed its initial public offering on the stock market, underwritten by Robertson, Colman & Siebel. In the summer of 1972, WCP formally reincorporated itself as Wangco, Inc., in order to avoid confusion with Wang Laboratories, another computer hardware manufacturer based in Tewksbury, Massachusetts. In April 1973, Wangco expanded to a 75,000-square-foot facility at an industrial park in nearby Marina del Rey, nearly double that of their old Santa Monica headquarters, which they maintained as a satellite office. In fiscal year 1973, Wangco expanded to producing hard disk drives, with a series of head-per-track disk drives capable of storing up to 100 MB, in both permanent disk and removable disk pack configurations. Wangco's F-series disk drives loaded the disk packs from the front, were rack-mountable, and measured 7 inches high; the company's T-series drives on the other hand were loaded from the top, were floor-standing only, and measured 74 inches high.

By 1974, Wangco had captured roughly 35 percent of the tape drive market, employed 400 workers, and had an international presence in Europe and Japan. It had over 100 active customers, 40 of which had signed OEM contracts with Wangco. Its single largest customer in 1974 was Olivetti, followed by Data General, General Automation, Data 100, Rockwell International, Raytheon, Sycor, Datum, Varian Data Machines, and Four-Phase Systems. By 1976, it was the second-largest manufacturer of tape drives in the United States. Employment at Wangco peaked at 650 workers in 1975, the same year the company signed its first major contract with a mainframe computer manufacturer, Sperry Univac, for $6 million worth of Wangco's tape drives.

In May 1976, Wangco signed a tentative agreement to be acquired by Perkin-Elmer, a major American technology company then based in Norwalk, Connecticut, for $30 million in a stock swap. Wangco and Perkin-Elmer's shareholders formally agreed to the terms of the acquisition in early June 1976, the deal being finalized on June 30, 1976. Wangco continued as a subsidiary of Perkin-Elmer, with Wang named president of the division and as a vice president of Perkin-Elmer. The division continued to expand afterwards, with Perkin-Elmer purchasing a 44.8-acre site at the Irvine Industrial Complex of Garden Grove, to reincorporate Wangco in September 1977. This marked the single-largest land purchase Garden Grove up to that point in time.

Wang left Wangco in 1978 to form Rexon, a manufacturer of minicomputers, in Culver City, California. Rexon itself would establish its own tape drive division, Wangtek, which competed with Wangco. After Wang sold Rexon to an investment bank in the 1980s, he founded WangDAT in 1987 to market data tape drives based on Digital Audio Tape cartridges, marking his third tape drive start-up and fourth start-up company overall.

== See also ==
- Kennedy Company, another tape drive manufacturer based in Los Angeles
- Cipher Data Products, a tape drive manufacturer based in San Diego
