= Parallan Computer =

Defunct American computer company

Meridian Data, Inc.
- Formerly: Parallan Computer, Inc. (1986–1994)
- Type: Public
- Industry: Computer
- Founded: July 1986; 40 years ago in Mountain View, California, United States
- Defunct: September 1999; 27 years ago
- Fate: Acquired by Quantum Corporation
- Headquarters: Santa Cruz, California (1994–1999)
- Products: Servers
- Website: meridian-data.com at the Wayback Machine (archived February 5, 1997)

Parallan Computer, Inc., was an American computer company active from 1986 to 1999 and based in Mountain View, California. The company was best known for their line of servers and collaborations with IBM for the latter's PS/2 Server range. In 1994, the company merged with Meridian Data, Inc., assuming the latter's name and marketing CD-ROM servers before moving into the network-attached storage (NAS) market with the Snap! Server. In 1999, Quantum Corporation acquired Meridian Data for $85 million.

== History ==
Parallan Computer was founded in July 1986 in Mountain View, California, by Gianluca Rattazzi, Charlie Bass, and William Patton. Rattazzi, Parallan's principal founder and president, was previously the manager for Olivetti's personal computing division. Bass had founded Ungermann-Bass, a computer networking company, in 1977; he was named Parallan's chairman. Patton was formerly the CEO of Management Assistance, Inc., a pioneering mini- and microcomputer company.

Parallan was founded to specialize in a class of servers known as application servers, designing their machines with multiple microprocessors to ensure high availability. The company targeted their products at large corporations such as airliners and banks, whose computer backbones usually consisted of mainframes and large local area networks comprising IBM Personal Computers and compatible systems. The company was able to accrue US$12 million in venture capital in the first four years of its foundation. (Note: Despite raising a healthy amount of capital, Parallan reportedly suffered from low cash reserves.) Its initial range of servers cost between $50,000 and $250,000 and made use of Intel's i486 processors as well as custom ASICs, allowing certain software to send packets of data through 64-bit-wide data paths, allowing for greater throughput. Parallan's ASICs specifically supported IBM's OS/2, their new general-purpose operating system, and LAN Manager, OS/2's networking counterpart. Parallan's servers were additionally based on IBM's proprietary Micro Channel bus architecture.

The company posted roughly $10 million in sales in 1991, representing 20 percent of total sales in the high-performance server market, which netted less than $50 million in sales that year. In April 1992, IBM announced that they had signed a deal with Parallan for exclusive rights to market, distribute, and sell Parallan's Server 290—a dual i486 machine built into a large, RS/6000—later in the year, in exchange for a 10-percent stake in Parallan for ten years. IBM's rebranded Parallan servers were eventually realized as the PS/2 Server 195 and 295—single- and dual-CPU versions of the Server 290, respectively.

Industry analysts initially remarked that IBM's stake in Parallan—later increased to 12 percent—had saved Parallan from the brink of collapse, as they had a $14.4 million deficit at the time. The partnership even compelled Parallan to file to go public, in February 1993. However, the partnership had made Parallan's revenues totally dependent on the PS/2 Servers, which did not fare very well, owing to market conflict with IBM's higher-end mainstream PS/2 models and PowerPC-based RS/6000 offerings and poor marketing. Parallan's revenue constricted roughly $2 million between the second and third fiscal quarters of 1993, and by April 1994, the deal between the two companies had reportedly fallen through. "Unfortunately for Parallan, IBM loves their partners to death", remarked John Dunkle, a president at a competing server manufacturer. Parallan and IBM formally terminated their partnership by late 1994.

Though Parallan had $36 million in cash reserves in the aftermath of the IBM partnership, the company ceased to be a manufacturing concern and had very little backstock of products. In December 1994, the company announced the acquisition of Meridian Data, Inc., of Scotts Valley, California, for $19 million in cash. Founded in 1986, Meridian Data was a pioneer of the CD-ROM format who had marketed a wide range of CD-ROM storage devices and servers in the early 1990s. Parallan assumed the Meridian Data name and merged operations, moving their headquarters to Scotts Valley accordingly.

In 1996, the combined Parallan and Meridian Data began pivoting to hard drive–based network-attached storage (NAS) devices, introducing their flagship Snap! Server in 1998. In May 1999, Quantum Corporation of Milpitas, California, announced their acquisition of Meridian Data for $85 million, allowing Quantum to enter the NAS market. The acquisition was finalized in September 1999, Quantum continuing to market the Snap Server for several years.
