= Tecmar =

American manufacturer

Tecmar Inc.
- Logo used in the 1980s

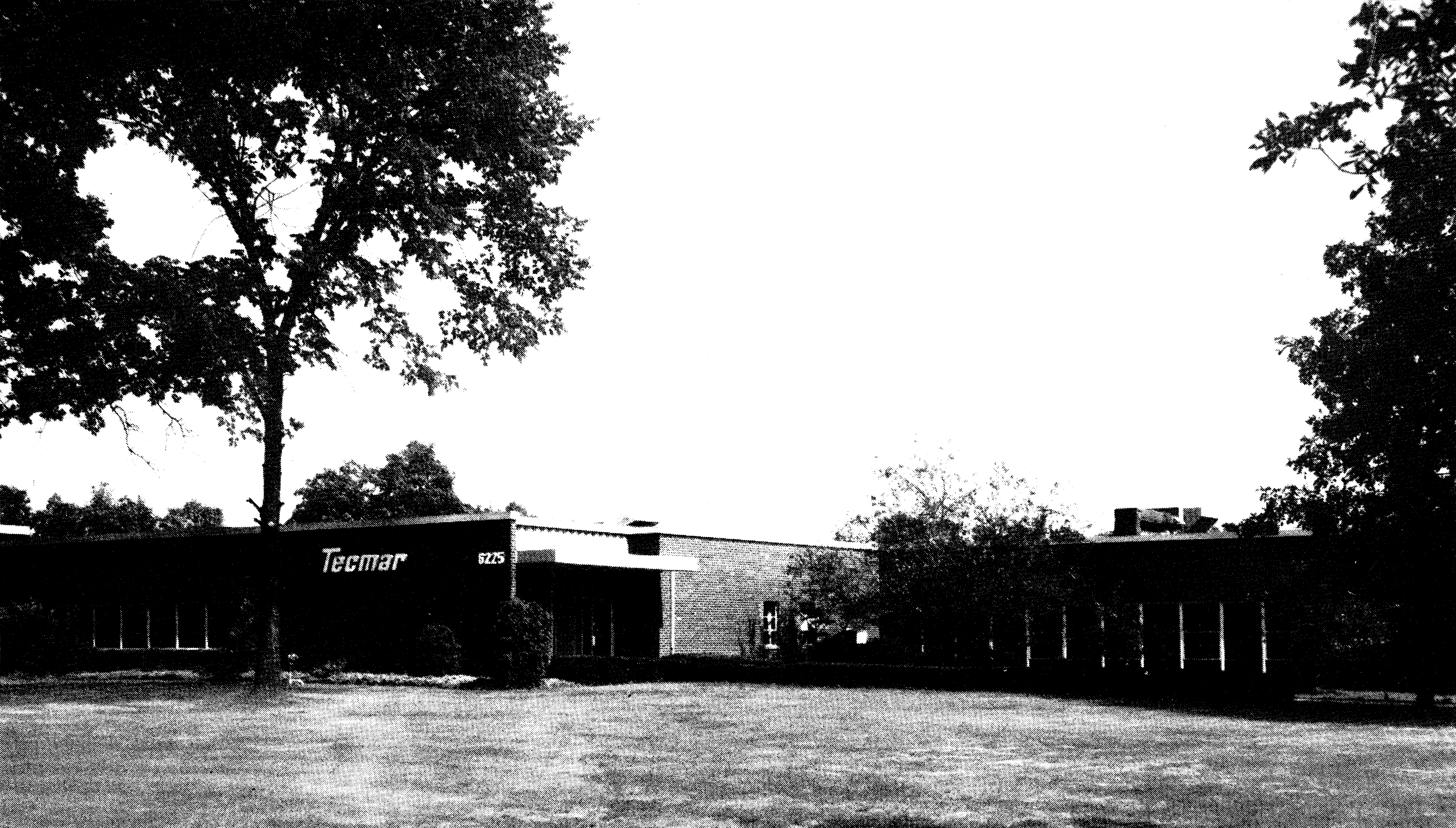
- Original headquarters in Solon, Ohio
- Industry: Computer
- Founded: 1974; 52 years ago in Solon, Ohio
- Founders: Martin Alpert; Carolyn Alpert
- Defunct: 2007; 19 years ago
- Fate: Acquired multiple times; brand and subsidiary dormant as of 2022
- Products: Computer enhancement products; Expansion cards
- Parent: Rexon (1986–1995); Legacy Storage Systems (1995–1998); TTI Holdings (1998–2000); Overland Data (2000–2007)

Logo used since c. 2000

Tecmar Inc. was an American manufacturer of personal computer enhancement products based in Solon, Ohio. The company was founded in 1974 by Martin Alpert, M.D., and Carolyn Alpert. The company's first products were computerized medical equipment; the company shortly after pivoted to data acquisition boards for the first generation of microcomputers. Popular products included the Scientific Solutions LabMaster series of boards for S-100 and Apple Computer.

== Scientific Solutions ==
Logo of Scientific Solutions

In 1981, at the COMDEX show, Tecmar introduced 20 expansion cards for the new IBM Personal Computer (IBM PC) announced three months earlier. Using experience in developing scientific and industrial products for Intel 8086 microcomputers, the company purchased two PCs on the first day and up to 50 employees worked on the peripherals; Tecmar's speed surprised even IBM. These products included the Scientific Solutions LabMaster, LabTender, IEEE-488, BaseBoard, TimeMaster, GraphicsMaster, memory expansion boards, external hard disk drives and tape drives. In 1985, Tecmar incorporated Scientific Solutions Inc. and used this new company to design and distribute the data acquisition products. Their early achievements are now well known and expressed by their corporate saying: Scientific Solutions First in PC Data Acquisition.

Scientific Solutions has been an independent company since 1995 and is still active as of 2022.

== Repositioning as a tape brand ==
By 1985 Tecmar had 600 employees and manufactured 100 Apple and IBM peripherals. IBM Product Centers sold Tecmar tape drives, giving the company an important advantage over rivals. By March 1986 Tecmar had 20% of the multifunction card market. That year Tecmar was acquired by the technology holding company Rexon. Alpert stayed on the board of directors briefly before founding Cumulus Corporation to market expansion cards for the IBM PS/2. While Scientific Solutions continued to design and market scientific and multimedia products, Tecmar concentrated on data storage. In 1991, Rexon purchased two other tape drive manufacturers, WangTek and WangDAT to add to the Tecmar product line. Then in 1995, while Rexon was having financial difficulties, Tecmar was sold to Legacy Storage Systems and Scientific Solutions continued as an independent company focused on the original Tecmar product line of data acquisition equipment.

Three years later, in 1998, Tecmar was sold to a new holding company, TTI Holdings of Longmont, Colorado, which positioned Tecmar as a comprehensive magnetic tape data storage brand. This was reinforced in 1999 when Iomega sold their Ditto brand to Tecmar. At this time, Tecmar offered DAT, QIC, Travan and Ditto magnetic tape technologies. In 2000, Overland Data saw this and acquired Tecmar in an effort to complement its line of higher end tape products.

As of 2007, Tecmar is a dormant corporation owned by Overland.
