= Mad Catz =

Chinese interactive entertainment company

Mad Catz, Inc.
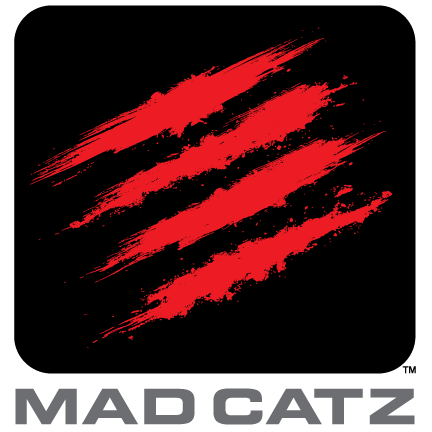
- Logo used from 2012
- Trade name: Mad Catz
- Formerly: Mad Catz Interactive Inc. (1989–2017)
- Type: Public
- Traded as: OTCID Basic: MCZAF
- ISIN: CA5561621056
- Industry: Computer hardware, personal computers, computer peripherals, gaming controllers
- Founded: 1989; 37 years ago in Toronto, Ontario, Canada, (first incarnation) 4 January 2018 (second incarnation)
- Founder: Raymond Tobey
- Defunct: 30 March 2017
- Fate: Chapter 11 bankruptcy, Liquidation
- Headquarters: San Diego, California, U.S.
- Area served: Worldwide
- Key people: Karyn Adouane; (Key Account Manager France) Sean Perry; (VP, Marketing); Hung Lo; (COO) Robert Hall; (Director, Product Design)
- Products: Gaming keyboards, mice, mouse pads, headphones, chairs
- Revenue: ▲US$ 61.9 million (2025)
- Operating income: ▼US$ 11.62 million (2016)
- Net income: ▼US$ 3.46 million (2016)
- Total assets: ▲US$ 55.03 million (2016)
- Total equity: ▼US$ 2.67 million (2025)
- Owner: Mad Catz Global Limited
- Number of employees: 59
- Parent: Mad Catz Interactive Inc.
- Divisions: GameShark, Tritton, Saitek, Joytech
- Website: madcatz.com

Mad Catz, Inc. (stylized as MAD CATZ in all caps) is an American third-party manufacturing designer and video gaming brand of interactive entertainment and PC products and accessories, currently produced by the Hong Kong–based company Mad Catz Global Limited. It was formerly produced by the original Chinese Mad Catz company until its bankruptcy in 2017. The former company had also produced video gaming cheat products under the GameShark brand, audio products under the TRITTON brand, and flight simulation sticks and chess hardware under the Saitek brand. Mad Catz was relaunched in January 2018, with worldwide retailer stores being present, and continues to make gaming peripherals.

== History ==
=== 1989–2000: Early days ===
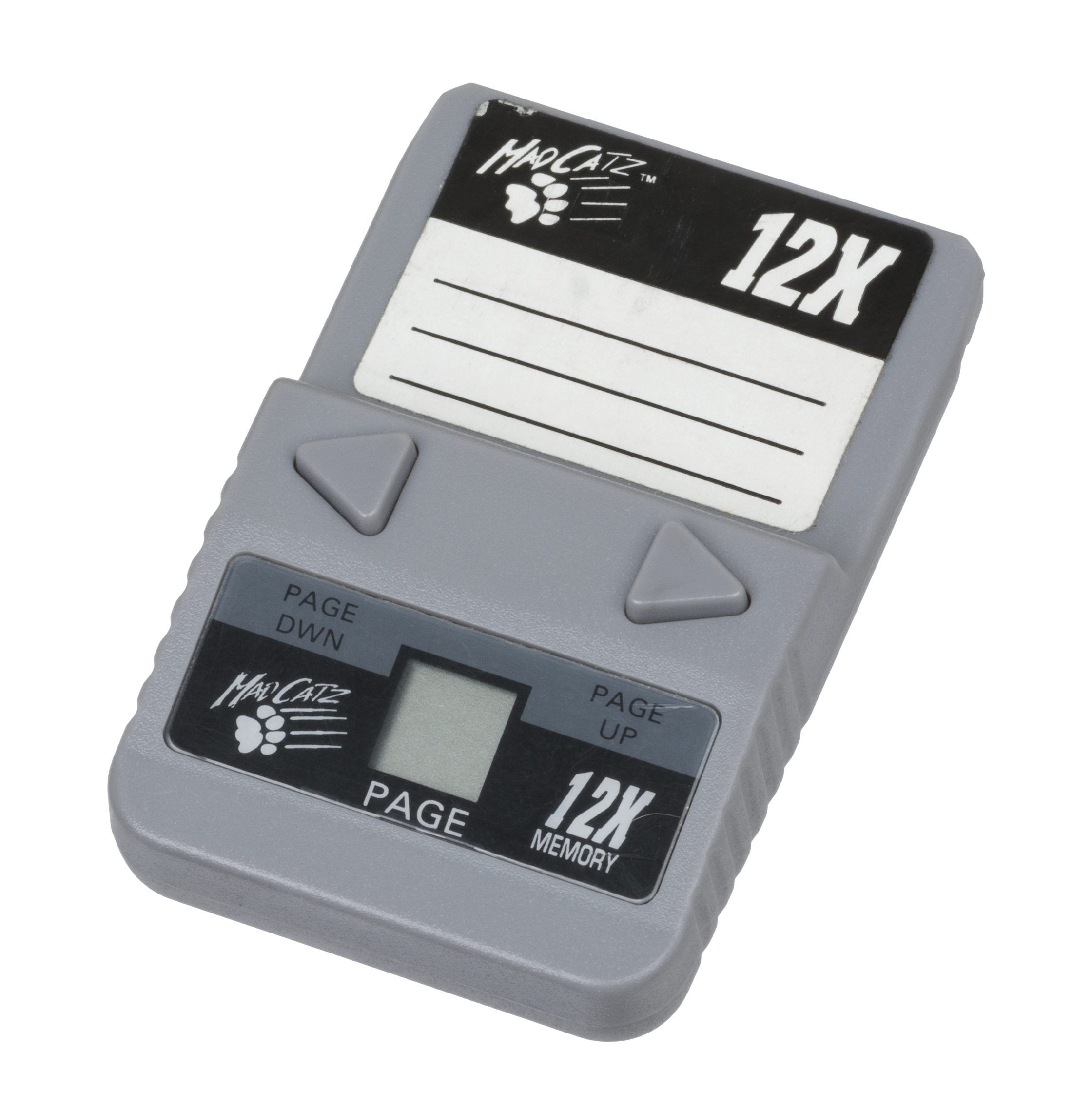
A memory card for the original PlayStation

Mad Catz, Inc. was initially founded in 1989 in Toronto, Ontario. It focused on accessories such as control pads, screen magnifiers, memory cards, connection cables, steering wheels, dust covers, joypads, power adapters, flight sticks, light guns, carrying cases, headphones and other human interface devices for the PC and various video game consoles. Mad Catz also published console game titles, such as Real World Golf 1 and 2, MC Groovz Dance Craze and Pump It Up.

Separately, in 1993, a company called Patch Ventures, Inc was founded. In 1994, Patch Ventures acquired a company called Legacy Manufacturing and renamed itself Legacy Storage Systems. In 1995, the assets of bankrupt Rexon were acquired by Legacy. In 1996, Legacy changed its name to Tecmar Technologies International(TTI). At this time, Legacy's primary line of business was the Tecmar brand of data storage accessories. This did not last long.

Over the period of 1998 to 2000, the company changed its focus. It:

- Sold its operating assets to Overland Data, ending its focus on the data storage industry,
- Changed its name to Xencet Investments,
- Acquired Games Trader, Inc. and renamed itself the same,
- Changed its name to GTR Group, Inc.,
- Acquired Mad Catz, Inc. (MCI)

=== 2000–2009: requirement and deals ===
In 2000, Mad Catz released the MC2 Racing Wheel for the PlayStation, which was awarded as the Golden Award by Incite Video Gaming Magazine, and the Mario Andretti Racing Wheel, which GameSpy judged as the best peripheral of the 2000 Electronic Entertainment Expo (E3). The company produced 12 licensed controllers for the launch of the Dreamcast and also released Internet-related accessories such as the Panther DC and keyboard adapter.

In September 2001, GTR Group changed its corporate name to Mad Catz Interactive, Inc., closing its GamesTrader and ZapYou.com business units. That same year, Mad Catz began to sell products for the newly released GameCube, PlayStation 2 and Xbox.

In January 2003, Mad Catz acquired the GameShark brand, and associated intellectual properties from InterAct for US$5 million.

In September 2007, Mad Catz acquired the UK-based company Joytech for US$3.7 million. In November 2007, Mad Catz further diversified into the videogame accessory market by acquiring European-based manufacturer Saitek for US$30 million.

In 2008, Capcom commissioned Mad Catz to produce a limited number of ArcadeSticks and six-button controllers, branded as "FightSticks" and "FightPads," to coincide with the launch of its Street Fighter IV fighting game.

=== 2010–2017: Rock band products, success and downfall ===
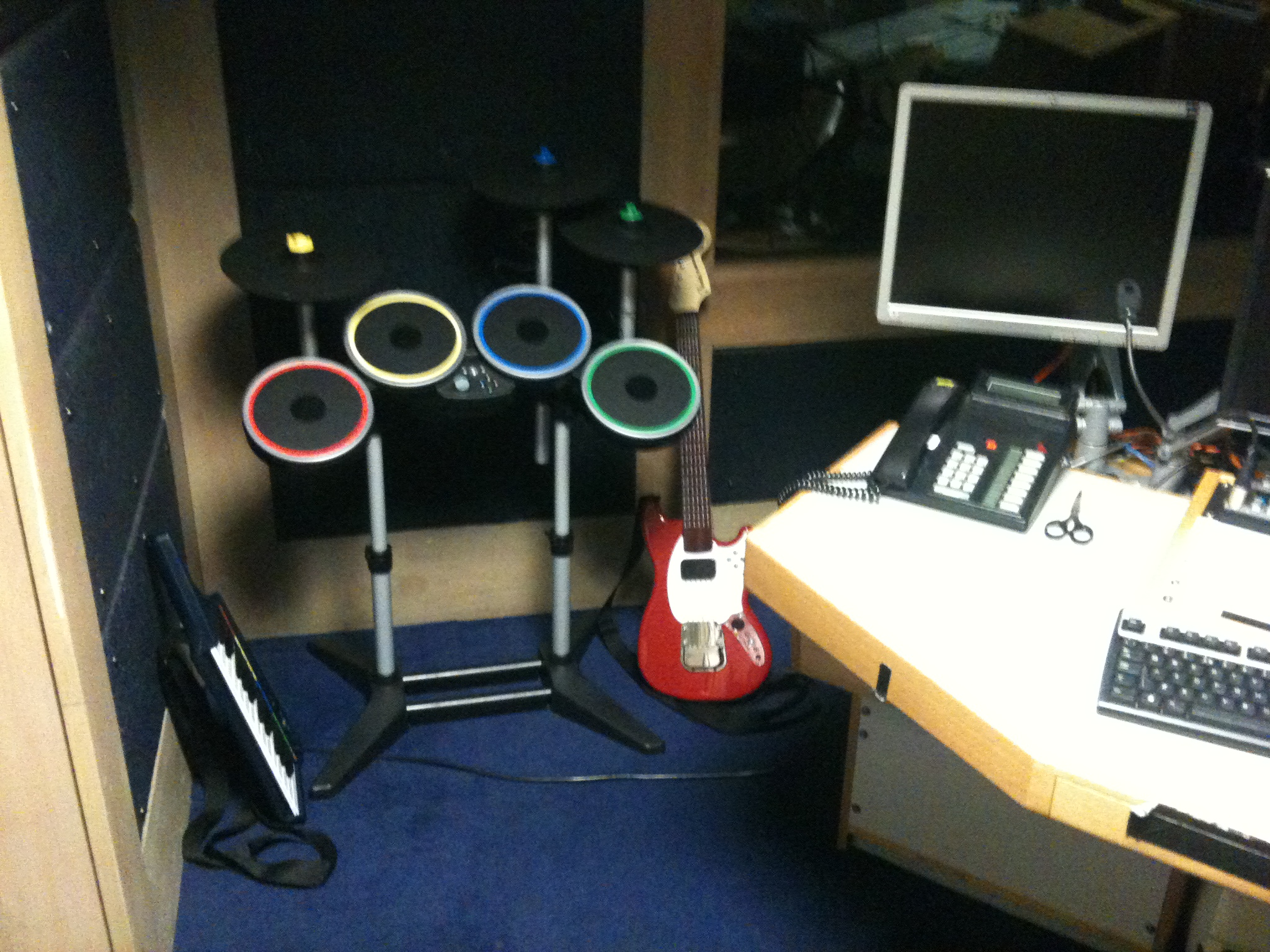
Mad Catz's Rock Band 3 controllers: Keyboard, Rock Band 3 Drumkit, and Mustang Pro (102-button) Guitar.

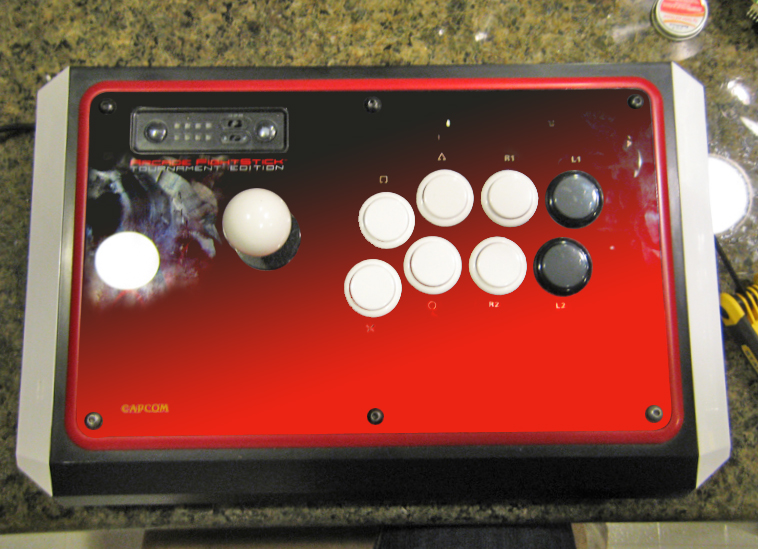
Mad Catz's Street Fighter IV FightStick Tournament Edition Arcade controller

In 2010, Mad Catz released officially licensed controllers for Rock Band 3, including a keyboard controller, a microphone controller, drum kits, and two guitar controllers (both the familiar five-button and the Fender Mustang "Pro" 102-button guitar). That same year, Mad Catz acquired TRITTON Technologies, a San Diego–based gaming audio headset firm, in May 2010 for US$1 million at closing. In June 2010, Mad Catz announced an agreement with Major League Gaming (MLG) to produce the MLG Pro Circuit Controller for Xbox 360 and PlayStation 3. Mad Catz sponsored MLG Pro Circuit Competitions.

In 2011, Mad Catz's Cyborg-branded R.A.T. 7 Gaming Mouse was named "Best PC Accessory of 2010" by IGN. The company returned to software distribution by publishing Jonah Lomu Rugby Challenge, Damage Inc. Pacific Squadron WWII (a World War II flight simulation game with a custom joystick), and Rock Band 3. Mad Catz acquired certain assets of V Max Simulation Corporation, which designs, constructs, integrates and operates flight simulation equipment and develops flight simulation software.

Mad Catz has continued its focus on peripherals and accessories, such as the range of R.A.T. gaming mice and TRITTON-branded gaming headsets. In January 2013, Mad Catz announced its "GameSmart" initiative, a range of products using the Bluetooth Smart stack featuring game and hardware independence, simplified setup, longer battery life and universal compatibility. Announced products include the R.A.T.^{M} Wireless Mobile Gaming Mouse, the F.R.E.Q.^{M} Mobile Stereo Headset, M.O.U.S.^{9} Wireless Mouse, and the C.T.R.L.^{R} Mobile Gamepad.

In June 2013, Mad Catz announced the M.O.J.O. Android Micro Console, described as "a supercharged smart phone with no screen that plugs into your flat screen TV to bring the living room experience to mobile gaming." M.O.J.O. is designed to interact seamlessly with Mad Catz's GameSmart controllers, mice, keyboards, headsets, and the rest of its gaming peripherals. In 2013, Mad Catz produced the Killer Instinct Arcade FightStick Tournament Edition 2, the first fighting game controller available for the Xbox One, the then-latest Microsoft gaming console, that started shipping in late November 2013.

In April 2015, Mad Catz announced that it would co-publish Rock Band 4 along with Harmonix, in addition to making the controllers for the game. Under the terms of the agreement, Mad Catz was responsible for worldwide retail sales, promotion, and distribution for the Rock Band 4 game and its hardware bundles. Harmonix handled Rock Band 4 digital sales and content. Rock Band 4 was launched on 6 October 2015.

In August 2015, Mad Catz announced that it will work with Cloud Imperium Games to create licensed simulation products for its space simulation game Star Citizen. These products, produced under Mad Catz's Saitek brand, were first unveiled at Gamescom 2015 and were detailed further at CitizenCon that same year.

On 9 February 2016, Mad Catz announced that it would lay off 37 percent of its workforce and stated that "Rock Band sell-through was lower than originally forecast resulting in higher inventory balances as well as lower margins due to increased promotional activity with retailers." This followed the resignations of company president and CEO Darren Richardson, senior VP of business affairs Whitney Peterson, and company chairman Thomas Brown the day prior. As of that year, the company had US$134.1 million revenue.

On 15 September 2016, Logitech acquired Saitek, Mad Catz's simulation brand specializing in computer joysticks for $13 million.

In March 2017, the New York Stock Exchange reported to the company that it was in the stages of delisting the company from the Exchange due to "abnormally low" stock value, which Mad Catz did not plan to appeal.

=== Bankruptcy ===
Mad Catz ceased operations on March 30, 2017, and filed a voluntary petition for relief under Chapter 7 of U.S. Bankruptcy code to initiate an orderly liquidation of its assets.

=== Return ===
On 4 January 2018, Mad Catz Global Limited (a new company headquartered in Kowloon, Hong Kong), with new ownership of previous Mad Catz trademarks, announced the return of the Mad Catz brand and the launch of a new line of products at CES 2018. Mad Catz Global Limited has continued the brand's development of gaming peripherals such as mice, keyboards, headphones, and controllers. In 2024, Mad Catz announced it will be entering the game publishing business with Yatagarasu Enter the Eastward.
