= Lee Data =

American computer company from 1979 to 2000

Apertus Technologies, Inc.
- Trade name: Carleton Corporation (1998–2000)
- Formerly: Lee Data Corporation (1979–1990)
- Industry: Computer hardware; Software
- Founded: 1979; 47 years ago in Eden Prairie, Minnesota
- Founder: John M. Lee; John Roy
- Defunct: January 2000; 26 years ago
- Fate: Acquired by Oracle Corporation
- Products: Data terminals; Terminal emulators; Data warehousing software
- Number of employees: 1,128 (1985, peak)

Lee Data Corporation was an American computer company based in Eden Prairie, Minnesota, and active as a hardware company from 1979 to 1990. It was principally founded by John M. Lee and John Roy to sell data terminal systems compatible with the IBM 3270. It found success going into the mid-1980s, with its offerings praised for their innovations and lower prices compared to IBM's 3270 line, but began faltering in the late 1980s when IBM themselves began adopting such innovations.

In 1990, the company sold off their terminal assets and pivoted to provide equipment and software for telecommunications businesses under the name Apertus Technologies, Inc.. Apertus changed their name again to Carleton Corporation in the mid-1990s. Carleton was acquired by Oracle Corporation in 2000.

== History ==
=== As Lee Data (1979–1990) ===
Lee Data Corporation was founded in early 1979 by John M. Lee and John Roy of Minneapolis. Both had formerly worked for Data 100 Corporation, a maker of data terminals and other peripherals for IBM mainframes and midrange computers, until January 1979, when Data 100 was purchased by Northern Telecom. In raising money for Lee Data, the two founders sought their former employer, Ed Orenstein, who gave them sufficient start-up capital to begin devising their first products, a family of data terminal systems compatible with the IBM 3270. Like IBM's offerings, Lee Data's terminal systems comprised multiple glass terminal units, as well as a controller unit and a printer. The company initially occupied a 21,000-square-foot plant in Eden Prairie, Minnesota; by April 1980, the company employed 31 manufacturing staffers there.

In its first year of operation, the company posted revenues of US$631,000. In fiscal year 1982, the company posted $13.6 million in revenues and announced its first profit of $1.9 million. Lee Data's fast growth was conducive to the success of their initial public offering on the over-the-counter market in November 1982. The success of the IPO made founder Lee a millionaire overnight. By the end of the next year, Lee Data posted an annual revenue of over $50 million and had cornered roughly four percent of the American data terminal market. Lee Data's single largest customer was the Bell System, accounting for roughly a quarter of the company's sales. Even long after the breakup of the Bell System in 1984, the Regional Bell Operating Companies formed in the aftermath provided a major source of revenue for Lee Data.

In 1983, the company attempted two acquisitions of competing technology companies that failed to go through for various reasons. The first was Wordtronix, Inc., a manufacturer of word processing systems also founded by ex–Data 100 employees, who directly competed with IBM and their Displaywriter System. Lee Data initially proposed to purchase Wordtronix for $6.4 million in a stock swap in July 1983. In September 1983, the acquisition was called off, Lee Data instead purchasing 19-percent ownership in Wordtronix. The second was of Visual Technology, Inc., a competing terminal manufacturer from Tewksbury, Massachusetts, whose acquisition Lee Data announced in November 1983 for $16.1 million in a stock swap. Lee Data sought to keep Visual Technology as a subsidiary while acquiring Visual's intellectual property. The bid for Visual collapsed in January 1985, however, shortly before the final signatures were inked. Lee Data agreed to pay $3 million in cancellation fees and agreeing to acquiring some of Visual Technology's patents as a result of the merger breaking down. Lee Data ultimately acquired the patents and designs for Visual Technology's unrealized "supermicrocomputer" based on the Intel 80286. Lee Data finished developing the product and marketed it as System 2000 in 1985.

In 1985, the company again announced two acquisitions of competing terminal companies. Unlike the botched acquisitions of Wordtronix and Visual Technology, however, the company successfully acquired these companies in January 1986, paying out the shareholders of both companies $4 million. The first company, Datastream Communications, Inc., was based in Santa Clara, California, and developed 3270-compatible cluster controllers and file transfer software, among other products; while the second company, Phaze Information Machines Corporation, developed IBM-compatible data terminals like Lee Data.

Employment at Lee Data peaked at 1,128 workers in early January 1985. That month, following poor financial performance in the company caused by price pressures from their competitors including IBM, Lee Data announced that they had laid off 106 workers across all departments. Employment hovered around the 1,100 mark around 1987, but the company announced a hiring freeze that year, owing to decreased sales and quarterly operating losses reaching $1.3 million. By the end of 1987, four of Lee Data's founding executive talent had resigned, and at the beginning of 1988, Lee Data sold their UK-based international subsidiary to Olivetti.

Lee Data attempted a pivot toward developing specialized computer networking software, in an attempt to bolster its bottom line against shrinking terminal sales. Despite their efforts, bloodletting at the company continued apace in 1989, the company laying off 260 of their 913 employees in October 1989 following a projected quarterly loss of $18 million. All told, the company lost between $45 million and $50 million in fiscal year 1989—ten times more than they had lost in 1988.

=== As Apertus Technology (1990–1997) ===
In February 1990, Lee Data sold their data terminal assets to Intelligent Information Systems, Inc., of Hackensack, New Jersey, for $8 million. Simultaneous with this announcement, founder John Lee announced his resignation as chairman, CEO, and president. In July 1990, Lee Data changed their name to Apertus Technologies, Inc., reflecting a full-time pivot to terminal emulation software for which they massively downsized, going from 650 employees in February 1990 to 275 employees in July 1990.

Under their new CEO Robert Gordon, Apertus made a dramatic recovery. By 1994, they had become the second most popular terminal emulator vendor, cornering 25 percent of that market share and earning a profit of $4.5 million on revenues of $26.9 million.

=== As Carleton Corporation (1997–2000) ===
Between October and November 1997, Apertus sold off their terminal emulation assets to Computer Network Technology Corporation of Plymouth, Massachusetts, for $11.4 million. Simultaneously, they acquired the Carleton Corporation of Minneapolis, a developer of data warehousing software. They later adopted Carleton as a trade name.

In 2000, Apertus (doing business as Carleton) was purchased by Oracle Corporation for $8.7 million in a stock swap.
