= Rexon =

Former manufacturer of computer products

- Industry: Computer Manufacturing
- Founded: 1978; 48 years ago in Culver City, California
- Founder: Ben C. Wang
- Fate: Bankruptcy, acquired by Legacy

Rexon Business Machines, later Rexon, Inc., was a manufacturer of small business computer systems founded by Ben C. Wang, the founder of Wangco, in 1978 in Culver City, California. It also became a major manufacturer of tape drives and related products. At its height, it played a significant role in the development and sale of magnetic tape data storage products. It traded on the NASDAQ under the symbol REXN until it filed for bankruptcy in 1995 and was acquired by Legacy Storage Systems, a Canadian company. It was last headquartered in Longmont, Colorado.

== Computers and software ==
Rexon computer systems were based on the proprietary RECAP operating system and ran Thoroughbred Basic a superset of Business Basic with operating system primitives right in the language. As of April 2013, there are still functional Rexon computers in use in various places worldwide. encompassIT.ca, a Canadian company, specializes in converting Rexon / RECAP software to a Microsoft Windows environment.

== Divisions ==
- Scientific Solutions - part of the Tecmar acquisition and spun off in 1995 as part of the bankruptcy.
- SyTron - Backup software vendor. Based in Westboro, MA. Sold to Arcada Software July 28, 1995.
- Tecmar - Acquired in 1986
- WangDAT - DAT/DDS tape drive manufacturer acquired by Rexon in 1991
- WangTek - QIC tape drive manufacturer. Based in Simi Valley, California. Founded as a subsidiary of Rexon in 1982.
- Factory in Ponce, Puerto Rico.
- Factory in Singapore.

== Demise ==
Prior to its bankruptcy filing, Rexon closed the Solon, OH and Ponce, Puerto Rico facilities and moved its operations to Longmont, CO. When Legacy acquired Rexon (out of Chapter 11 bankruptcy), it was renamed Tecmar Technologies, Inc. (TTInc) and operated as an independent subsidiary. In 1997, Legacy changed its name to Tecmar Technologies International (TTIntl). In 2000, the assets of TTInc were sold to Overland Data, but as of 2007, the Tecmar, WangTek, and WangDAT brands are no longer in use.
