= MAI Systems =

American computer company

MAI Systems Corporation
- Formerly: Management Assistance Inc. (1957–1971); Basic/Four Corporation (1971–1985); MAI Basic Four, Inc. (1985–1990)
- Type: Public (defunct)
- Industry: Computer hardware, Software
- Founded: 1957
- Founder: Walter Oreamuno, Jorge González-Martén
- Defunct: 2005
- Fate: Hotel division sold to Appian Corporation; company dissolved
- Headquarters: Santa Ana, California, U.S.
- Key people: Bennett S. LeBow, William Patton, Fred Anderson, William Weksel
- Products: Basic/Four systems, MAI 3000, MAI 4000, Open BASIC, hotel reservation systems

MAI Systems Corporation, or simply MAI, was a United States-based computer company best known for its Basic/Four product and the customized computer systems that ran it. It was later known for its computer reservation systems used in the hotel industry.

The company formed in 1957 as a consulting firm, Management Assistance Inc.. In the early 1960s they created a profitable niche leasing IBM mainframes and grew to have income in the millions. When the System/360 was announced the company was left with hundreds of millions of dollars' worth of suddenly outdated equipment, and by 1971 the company was almost insolvent. The company re-launched that year starting several new subsidiaries. Among these was Basic/Four Corporation which sold customized minicomputers running their version of Business Basic, Genesis One that bought and sold obsolete equipment, and Sorbus, which performed servicing on computer equipment. Genesis One was never very successful, and while Sorbus was modestly profitable, by 1975 two-thirds of MAI's income was from Basic/Four.

By the mid-1980s, the introduction of the IBM PC was shaking up the entire computer market and MAI was once again losing money. Asher Edelman began a proxy war to take over the company, and on achieving this in 1985, immediately began liquidation. Sorbus was sold to Bell Atlantic and Basic/Four sold to Bennett S. LeBow. Basic/Four took over the MAI marque, and the product, now running on the Unix-like UCOS system, became MAI Basic Four, Inc. This was re-launched in 1990 as Open BASIC on the PC, becoming MAI Systems at that time. Using the money LeBow organized during the leveraged buyout, the company purchased a number of other companies in an effort to diversify. Among these was Computerized Lodging Systems, who made booking systems for hotels.

The Business BASIC market disappeared, and the company was declared bankrupt in 1993. They emerged from Chapter 11 later that year, focused on the hotel software market, the division now named Hotel Information Systems. In this form they continued until the early 2000s, until being purchased by Appian Corporation in 2005.

== History ==
=== Leasing business ===
Walter Oreamuno, an immigrant to the United States from Costa Rica, won a problem-solving contest run by IBM. Using the winnings, he formed Management Assistance Inc. in 1955 with fellow Costa Rican, Jorge González-Martén, performing computer consulting in areas underserved by IBM, like Costa Rica and the Philippines, and then Europe and Canada.

In 1956, IBM entered a consent decree with the Department of Justice that forced them to sell their mainframe computers, not just lease them. Oreamuno and González-Martén saw an opportunity; they offered companies that had recently purchased an IBM system to buy the system and lease it back to them at a rate lower than IBM would. This meant the company did not have to use its own capital to buy the systems, and their first customers were mainly banks who could easily arrange the required financing.

IBM depreciated its systems very rapidly and this led to a large market for used machines at very low costs. Using the profits from their early leasing arrangements, the company began buying systems of their own. In 1961 the company went public, raising $300,000 (equivalent to $3,232,183 in 2025). The company began a rapid expansion and by 1966 had amassed about $200 million in systems (equivalent to $1.984615385×10^{9} in 2025) and its shares soared to $55 a share.

In 1965, IBM introduced the System/360. This immediately rendered almost every other computer obsolete overnight. MAI had two-year contracts for their systems, and customers began cancelling them as they purchased new ones that worked with the 360. Oreamuno continued purchasing older systems to lease to customers who did not need the 360, but this proved unwise. MAI attempted a merger with Transamerica Corporation in 1967, but this fell apart. Oreamuno resigned as chief executive officer was replaced by Luther Schwalm, formerly of IBM.

Under Schwalm, the company stopped purchasing punch card and related systems that were now outdated, and began purchasing newer systems like hard disk drives. In spite of these corrective measures, in 1967 they had a $17 million write-down of their older hardware. The company's fortunes quickly soured; in 1970 they had $60 million in revenue but $140 million in debt with a total net worth of negative $28 million.

=== Reorganization and Basic/Four ===
In 1969, González-Martén went to the board of directors with a new proposal; for $6.5 million he proposed to develop a new minicomputer that would use computer terminals as its primary input and thereby leave behind the punch card-based workflows of the mainframe systems. Shortly after having made the proposal, González-Martén returned to Costa Rica. In 1970, MAI president Sol Gordon asked him to return, setting up a new division, Basic/Four in Santa Ana, California.

In 1971, chief financial officer Raymond Kurshan took over as president and González-Martén returned to Costa Rica. Kurshan reorganized the firm into three divisions, Basic/Four Corporation continued development of their new platform, Genesis One took over the existing leasing business with an eye to selling off the equipment, and Sorbus was a new service organization formed from the service side of MAI's leasing business. The new systems were introduced with four models in June 1972 at the Commodore Hotel in San Francisco. The key concept behind the platform was its use of Business Basic, which offered COBOL-like record handling in the BASIC computer language and multi-user account handling. The systems were an immediate success, and by 1975, sales had grown $43 million, two-thirds of MAI's income.

Suddenly profitable again, the company began expanding their product line. In 1977, the company bought Wordstream Corporation and sold their word processing systems that ran on IBM terminals. They also introduced a number of applications written in Business Basic, including EASY, a reporting system, and Business Data statistics software. In 1979, they introduced the DataWord II, which operated both as a word processing system and a terminal. However, new entrants into the standalone word processing market, especially Wang, quickly rendered their products unprofitable and they exited that market in 1980.

By 1980, they announced the sale of their 10,000th system, but profitability was once again dropping significantly. To stem the loss of customers, in 1983 they introduced the MAI 8000, a supermini capable of supporting 96 simultaneous users. However, by this point the 1981 introduction of the IBM PC was gaining momentum, and the margins continued to contract. They company then began a diversification process, entering niche business like pharmaceutical firms, sewing-goods companies, and non-profit agencies. This was not successful, and for the year the Basic/Four division reported a loss of $10.2 million.

=== Breakup and the new MAI ===
In 1984, Asher Edelman purchased 12% of MAI's outstanding shares, and began a proxy war for control of the company. This led to him placing four of the ten seats on the board of directors. He gained outright control in August, causing Kurshan to resign his positions as chairman, president and CEO. Edelman immediately began liquidating the company. Sorbus was sold to a Bell Atlantic subsidiary and Basic/Four was purchased in a $100 million leveraged buyout by Bennett S. LeBow.

LeBow renamed the company as MAI Basic Four, Inc., now privately held. He immediately sold the Canadian division to Bell Atlantic for $23 million. LeBow brought in William Patton to turn around the fortunes of the rest of the company, which they did by focussing on their existing 27,000 strong customer base, and narrowing future sales to eight key markets where they were well represented. In September 1986, the company reported a $17 million profit on sales of $281 million, and the company was once again taken public.

In 1986, the company introduced the MAI 3000 midrange system, and in 1987, the expandable MAI 4000. Although the company represented only about 1% of the minicomputer market, these models were nevertheless successful and the next year was among the company's best, with $22.8 million profits from sales of $321 million. With this cash, the company re-purchased MAI Canada and portions of Sorbus, along with twenty-five smaller software firms aimed at specific industries. In 1988, they had their record year, with $24.5 million profits on $420 million in sales.

=== 1989 downturn and reorganization as MAI Systems ===
Sales began to slip in the second half of 1988, and LeBow put his shares up for sale. No one expressed an interest, so instead, in November 1988 LeBow decided to use MAI as the basis for a takeover/merger of Prime Computer. By early 1989, the United States computer market had a sudden downturn and sales plummeted. In June, Patton resigned as president. The takeover attempt failed in June, having cost $25 million and generating considerable ill-will among MAI's customer base. In August 1989, LeBow-controlled Brooke Partners invested $55 million and became the largest shareholder. LeBow resigned control positions, and Fred Anderson became the president and chief operating officer while William Weksel became the CEO and chair.

In April 1990, the company purchased Computerized Lodging Systems, who produced a series of software systems for the hotel industry. They also released Open BASIC, a version of Business Basic that ran on a variety of operating systems. The company name was changed to MAI Systems later that year. In 1991, the company began winding down its manufacturing and became a reseller of commercial off-the-shelf systems. The company continued to lose money, and reported a loss of $182 million for fiscal 1992.

In March 1993, a group of European banks took control of MAI's European operations, and the rest of the company entered Chapter 11. They emerged from Chapter 11 in 1993 as a much smaller company focussed mainly on their niche market software systems like hotel booking and food services (through the Sextant division). The company continued to retrench through the 1990s and the remaining hotel unit was sold to Appian, Inc. in 2005.

== See also ==
- MAI Systems Corp. v. Peak Computer, Inc.
