= Saitek =

Designer and manufacturer of consumer electronics

- Type: Subsidiary
- Industry: PC gaming pripherals
- Founded: 1979; 47 years ago
- Headquarters: Worldwide
- Products: PC Games Controllers, PC Peripherals, Mice & Keyboards, PC + iPod Speakers, Headsets, Flight Simulators.
- Number of employees: 2500+
- Parent: Logitech
- Website: saitek.com

Saitek is a designer and manufacturer of consumer electronics founded in 1979 by Swiss technologist Eric Winkler. They are best known for their PC gaming controllers, mice, keyboards, and their numerous analogue flight controllers such as joysticks, throttles, and rudder pedals.

Most Saitek products have been rebranded as Logitech G products since their acquisition by the company.

== History ==
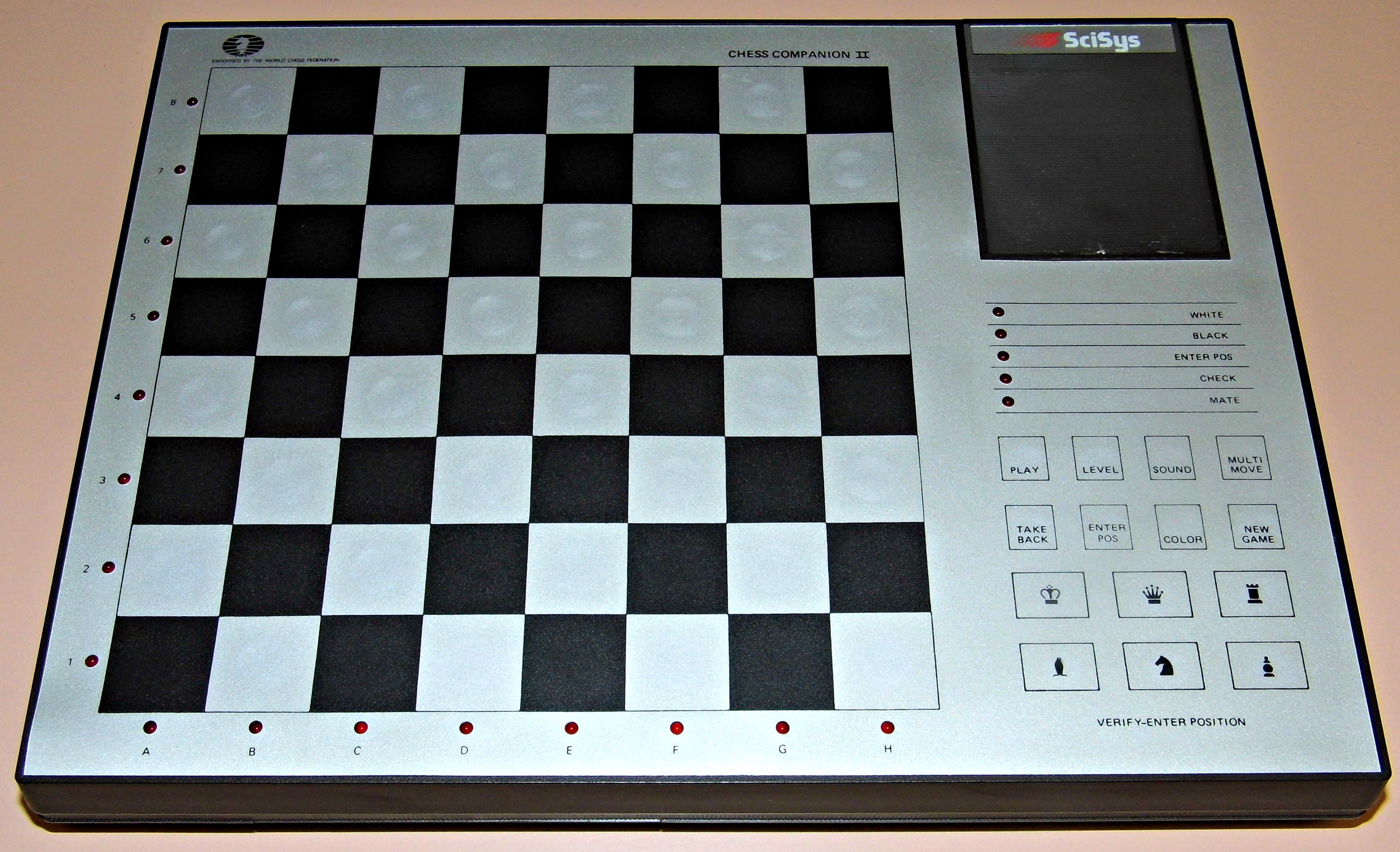
SciSys Chess Companion II (1983)

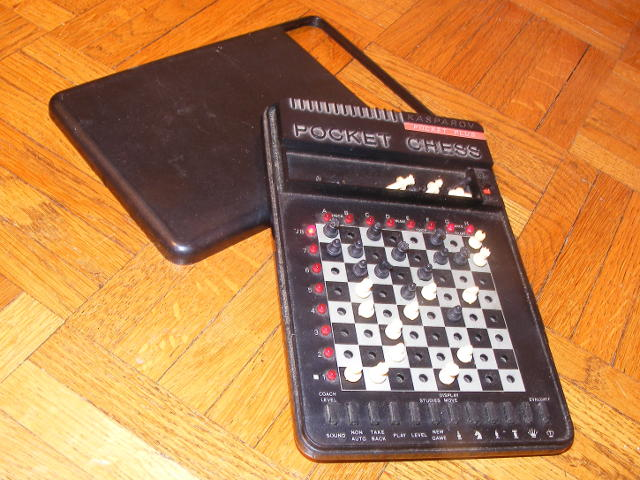
In 1987, Saitek developed the Pocket Plus in collaboration with Garry Kasparov.

Saitek (originally called SciSys until 1987) was founded in 1979 by Swiss technologist Eric Winkler as a manufacturer of electronic chess games. By the 1990s the company had distribution and design offices in the United States, Germany, France and the United Kingdom. It had also built a factory in China and had started to provide outsourced manufacturing services to Western brands. In 1994, Saitek acquired Hegner & Glaser's successful Mephisto line of chess computers. Saitek diversified into PC peripherals, focusing on game controllers for flight simulation, driving and first-person gaming. Saitek has also expanded into PC peripherals, with an emphasis on input, connectivity and multimedia. In 2005, Saitek launched a high fidelity audio product line for PC & iPod.

On November 14, 2007, Mad Catz announced that they had purchased Saitek for $30 million. However, the company’s manufacturing operations remained independent and were renamed Ryder Industries. Ryder Industries continued as an electronics manufacturing services (EMS) provider focused on high-mix, low-volume manufacturing for original equipment manufacturers.

On September 15, 2016, Logitech announced that they had purchased the Saitek brand and assets from Mad Catz for $13 million in cash.

== Products ==
=== Pro Flight Controllers ===
- Pro Flight Yoke System
- Pro Flight Throttle Quadrant
- TPM System

=== Pro Flight Panels ===
- Pro Flight Backlit Information Panel
- Pro Flight Multi Panel
- Pro Flight Radio Panel
- Pro Flight Switch Panel
- Pro Flight Instrument Panel

=== Pro Flight Sticks ===
- X-56 H.O.T.A.S. System (2018)
- X-55 Rhino H.O.T.A.S. System (2014)
- X-65F Flight Combat Control System (2008)
- X52 Pro Flight Control System (2007)
- X52 Flight Control System (2004)
- X45 Digital Joystick and Throttle (2001)
- X36 Flight Control System (1999), consisting of the X36F Control stick and X35T throttle

=== Flight Sticks ===
- Aviator for PS3, Xbox 360 and PC
- Cyborg F.L.Y.9 Wireless Flight Stick for Xbox 360/PS3
- Cyborg F.L.Y 5 Flight Stick for PC
- Cyborg 2000 Flight Stick for PC
- Cyborg Evo Flight Stick for PC (2003)
- ST290 Flight Stick for PC

=== Pro Flight Rudder Pedals ===
- Pro Flight Rudder Pedals
- Pro Flight Combat Rudder Pedals
- Cessna Pro Flight Rudder Pedals

=== Accessories ===
- Pro Flight Headset
- Action Pad

=== Cessna Controllers ===
- Pro Flight Cessna Yoke System
- Pro Flight Cessna Trim Wheel
- Pro Flight Cessna Rudder Pedals

=== Farming Equipment ===
- Heavy Equipment Bundle for PC
- Heavy Equipment Side Panel for PC

=== Keyboard ===
- Saitek Cyborg programmable keyboard for PC
