= Business Basic =

Category of BASIC interpreters specialized for business use

Business Basic is a category of variants of the BASIC computer programming language which were specialized for business use on minicomputers in the 1970s and 1980s. To the underlying BASIC language, these dialects added record handling instructions similar to those in COBOL, allowing programmers to build complex file-handling applications using what was at that time a much more modern programming language. MAI Systems released the first example as MAI Basic Four in 1972, and several similar versions emerged through the 1970s.

Business Basics added indexed file access methods to the normal set of BASIC commands, and were optimised for other input/output access, especially display terminal control. The two major families of Business Basic are Basic/Four and Data General Business Basic. In addition, the Point 4 company, which developed the IRIS operating system, had their own version of BASIC. The UniBASIC owned by Dynamic Concepts of Irvine is a derivative of the Point 4 BASIC.

In the 1980s, Business Basics were ported from their original proprietary environments to many Unix platforms, CP/M, and to DOS. In the 1990s, some Business Basics were ported to Linux and Windows, and Business Basic integrated development environments became available. Notably, in 1990 MAI's version was ported from their BOSS operating system to become the multi-platform Open BASIC.

Business Basic continues to be widely used due to the very large base of application software.

== See also ==
- Apple Business BASIC (Apple ///)
- AlphaBasic (Alpha Microsystems, AMOS)
- B32 Business Basic (Data General Eclipse MV, UNIX, MS-DOS)
- Rexon
- Dartmouth BASIC (see also True BASIC)
- ProvideX
- Thoroughbred Software International, Inc., Business Basic, Solution IV Accounting; IDOL, IDOL-IV, Open Workshop
- BBx, now known as (visual) PRO/5 and its Java-running counterpart BBj, both edited by Basis Intl
