= Snap Server =

Network attached storage computer appliance

The Snap Server is a network attached storage computer appliance sold since 2008 by Overland Storage. From 2002 to 2004 it was sold by a company called Snap Appliance.

== Description ==
All modern Snap Servers include an embedded operating system called GuardianOS. The GuardianOS is a UNIX-like operating system based on the mainstream Linux kernel, and is used on the Snap Server line of network-attached storage devices. Older models used the SnapOS, which is a heavily customized BSD flavor. The SnapOS was originally created by Meridian Data for the Meridian Data Snap! Server, and shipped on products from May 1998 through February 2006.

Quantum had shipped more than 90,000 Snap Servers as of December 31, 2001. As of the end of 2003, an estimated 150,000 Snap Servers had been sold. Many Snap Servers are visible operating on the open Internet, although it is generally more common for them to be deployed inside corporate intranets.

== History ==
The ownership of the Snap Appliance product family went through several corporate mergers.

Meridian Data (founded in 1994 as Parallan Computer, based in Scotts Valley, California) had been shipping CD-ROM servers, which was a shrinking market in the late 1990s. In 1996 it started development of a network file server which it announced at the DEMO conference in February 1998. In May 1998 Meridian Data began shipping the Meridian Data Snap! Server. On May 10, 1999, Meridian agreed to be acquired by Quantum Corp. in a stock swap. In December 1999 the deal closed, worth an estimated $85 million.

- In October 2002 Quantum's Snap division was purchased by private investors for about $11 million, forming Snap Appliance.
- In July 2004 Snap Appliance was purchased by Adaptec for about $100 million.
- In July 2008 Overland Storage acquired the Snap server product line from Adaptec for $3.6 million.
