= MAI Systems Corp. v. Peak Computer, Inc. =

American Court of Appeals Case

- Court: United States Court of Appeals for the Ninth Circuit
- Full case name: MAI Systems Corporation v. Peak Computer, Inc., et al
- Submitted: June 4, 1992
- Decided: April 7, 1993
- Citation: 991 F.2d 511 (9th Cir. 1993)

Court membership
- Judges sitting: Harry Pregerson, Melvin T. Brunetti, Ferdinand Francis Fernandez

Case opinions
- Majority: Brunetti

Laws applied
- 17 U.S.C. § 117

MAI Systems Corp. v. Peak Computer, Inc., 991 F.2d 511 (9th Cir. 1993), was a case heard by the United States Court of Appeals for the Ninth Circuit which addressed the issue of whether the loading of software programs into random-access memory (RAM) by a computer repair technician during maintenance constituted an unauthorized software copy and therefore a copyright violation. The court held that it did, although the United States Congress subsequently enacted an amendment to 17 U.S.C. § 117 to specifically overrule this holding in the circumstances of computer repair.

== Background ==
Peak Computer, Inc. is a computer maintenance company that organized in 1990. Peak maintained computer systems for its clients by performing routine maintenance and emergency repairs. When providing maintenance or making emergency repairs, Peak booted the MAI Systems computer, causing the MAI operating system to be loaded from the hard disk into RAM. MAI also alleged that Peak ran MAI's diagnostic software during Peak's service calls.

This case involved the two parties MAI Systems and Peak Computer, as well as defendant Eric Francis, a former MAI Systems Corporation employee who joined Peak Computer, Inc.

== Copyright issues ==
MAI contended that Peak's use of the MAI operating system constituted copyright infringement. MAI argued that the license agreement which permitted an end user to make a copy of the program for their own use did not extend to Peak because Peak was not the licensee and therefore had no rights under the license agreement.

The court agreed and granted partial summary judgment which prohibited Peak from continuing their method of operation. The court determined that a copy of a program made from a hard drive into RAM for purpose of executing the program was, in fact, a copy under the Copyright Act. The judges utilized the criteria set forth by 17 U.S.C. § 101, which states 'A work is "fixed" in a tangible medium of expression when its embodiment in a copy or phonorecord, by or under the authority of the author, is sufficiently permanent or stable to permit it to be perceived, reproduced, or otherwise communicated for a period of more than transitory duration.'

17 U.S.C. § 117 allows copies made as an essential step in utilizing the software to be made without permission of the copyright holder by the owner of a copy of the software. Nonetheless, the court believed that this clause did not apply because end users of MAI's software were mere licensees. The court also considered two additional facts: Peak had unlicensed copies of MAI's operating system at Peak's headquarters and the unlicensed loaning of computers featuring MAI's operating system to Peak's customers.

Based on the above facts, the court found that Peak was liable for copyright infringement. This decision was criticized by legal scholars.

== Trade secret misappropriation ==
Several employees left MAI and joined Peak, namely defendant Francis. When MAI's customers learned of their switch, several customers also switched their business based on previously developed business relationships. MAI contends that Peak misappropriated trade secrets, specifically their customer database, which MAI claims was developed and tweaked to give their customers the best experience. Peak argued that not only was the database not a trade secret, but also it did not take or utilize the database in any way. The court ruled that the database was in fact a trade secret but found that no portion of the customer data was taken by any former employees. Acknowledging that, the court stated "Merely informing a former employer's customers of a change of employment, without more, is not solicitation." However, Francis went beyond mere notification and visited former MAI customers and made personal phone calls to current MAI customers in order to encourage MAI customers to switch to Peak.

MAI also alleged that Peak misappropriated trade secrets by using FIBs (Field Information Bulletins) in their own business practices. MAI issued these FIBs internally which contained briefings for the latest MAI technology and practices. The court agreed with MAI's claim that these documents were trade secrets. However, the court found this to be an issue of material fact and could not validate MAI's claims based on the evidence provided.

The third point of trade secret misappropriation came from the MAI diagnostic software. MAI claimed that the diagnostic software contained important trade secrets that Peak misappropriated when loading a copy into RAM. Despite these claims, MAI failed to enumerate the specific trade secrets contained within the software and the court dismissed this claim.

== Other issues ==
The court ruled that despite the fact that FIBs were not misappropriated by Peak, Peak was falsely misleading customers by contending that it had the same ability to service MAI computers as MAI. This was an issue of fact because if Peak was unable to use or view the FIBs, they could not possibly have the complete knowledge required to repair the machines.

MAI also brought claims of trademark infringement against Peak. Specifically, Peak contended that a certain subset of MAI's computers were a part of the Peak product offerings. The court found these claims to cause consumer confusion in which potential MAI customers would think that Peak was authorized, the same as, or working with MAI Systems.

== See also ==
- Copyright law of the United States
- Software copyright
- Vault Corp. v. Quaid Software Ltd.
