= IBM Product Center =

Former store

- Type: Subsidiary
- Industry: Retail
- Founded: 1980; 46 years ago
- Defunct: 1986; 40 years ago
- Fate: Acquired by NYNEX
- Successor: NYNEX Business Centers
- Products: Office equipment, personal computers
- Parent: International Business Machines

IBM Product Center was an American retailer wholly owned by International Business Machines that sold the company's office equipment, which consisted at the time mostly of photocopiers, typewriters and personal computers. The first store opened in 1980 in downtown Philadelphia, Pennsylvania. NYNEX acquired the stores from IBM in 1986 and renamed them to NYNEX Business Centers.

== History ==
External videos
- IBM Product Center commercial from 1984, starring William Bogert

By serving retail, walk-in customers, the Product Center differed from IBM's traditional use of salesmen with territories and accounts. The stores ran concurrent with IBM's Business Computer Centers, which were demonstration and training centers for the company's products established in the 1920s. While these Business Computer Centers were aimed at small and large businesses alike, the Product Centers were aimed chiefly to market IBM's lower-cost office equipment at small businesses and home office buyers.

The Product Centers featured bright red carpet and ceiling speakers that played pop music. Its flagship Philadelphia store in 1981 sold just 17 products: Several models of word processors and typewriters, a POS cash register, a dictation machine, a Series III photocopier (the Product Center's most expensive product at the time, which retailed $39,000—$138,113 in 2025) and the newly-released IBM Personal Computer. The IBM PC proved so desirable that it warranted its own table display in the back of the store. The Product Centers later stocked other companies' peripherals for IBM's machines, such as Tecmar's tape drive add-ons for the IBM PC.

Logo of NYNEX Business Centers

Three locations had opened by mid-1981, in Philadelphia, Baltimore, and San Francisco. By 1986, there were 81 locations, 13 of which were in California. In April of that year, IBM sold all their stores to NYNEX, a company that had spun off from the breakup of AT&T in 1984. IBM cited low sales compared to their independent authorized computer dealers in their decision to sell the locations. The existence of the Product Centers had apparently been causing friction with these independent dealers, though IBM had not participated in the fierce price wars over IBM's products that the dealers were fighting among themselves. In the words of economist Leonard J. Parsons, who had been evaluating the performance of the Retail Centers for a research article in the years before it closed, "IBM decided that it was a technology company, not a retailer". NYNEX renamed these locations as NYNEX Business Centers and combined their inventory of IBM products with its own telecommunications equipment.

== See also ==
- Apple Store
