= Saitek X52 =

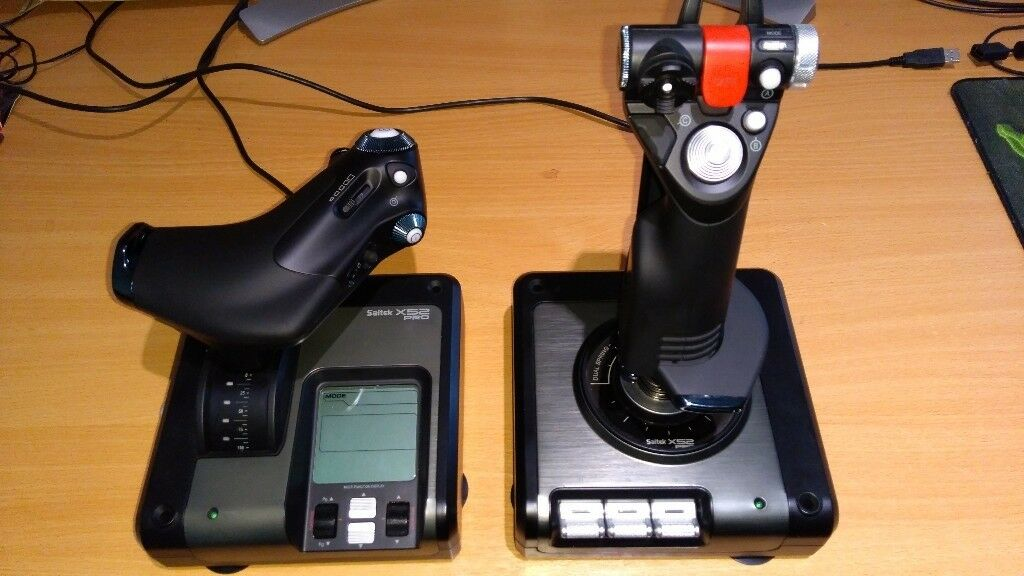
Saitek X52 Pro HOTAS

The Saitek X52 is an advanced HOTAS joystick/throttle combination from Saitek released in 2004.

== Features ==
The X52 was one of Saitek's flagship products and features both a joystick and a throttle. It features a large backlit blue (or green, on an X52 Pro) LCD on the throttle, which displays the mode it is configured, the name of the button being depressed and a chronograph function. The Multi-Function Display (MFD) screen can be used to check programmed command names and use the clock and stopwatch function for timing the legs of your flight plan.

The joystick/throttle combination includes a number of controls, including trim wheels, a thumb operated slider, a mouse control and three eight-way hat switches, and a button under a flip-guard labeled "Safe". The stick includes built in yaw/rudder control, which can be disabled in the case that the user has an alternate rudder control.

The stick/throttle combination are designed to function as a HOTAS system. This means that games can be played without the player ever taking their hands off the controls to use a keyboard or mouse.

The X52 uses only a single spring mounted vertically to keep it centered, while the X52 Pro uses dual springs for stronger centering. This enables quick direction changes on the stick without "clicking" through the axes - a problem common to other sticks which normally feature two springs mounted horizontally. The X52 also features an integrated mouse on the throttle, however it is difficult to use for making quick selections and only functions when drivers and the SST software are installed.

== Programming Software ==
The Smart Technology (ST) programming software is used to program all kinds of behaviors for each command of the HOTAS, even custom ones such as setting not only the Pinkie switch, but just about any button to act as a shift, making it possible, then, to have multiple shift buttons configured per game Profile, which raise the total number of programmable commands far above the canon limit of 282.

Furthermore, the ST programming software allows gamers to configure their controls to suit their preferred gaming style and to save the configurations as personal game Profiles, which can be selected and applied on-the-fly at any time through the HOTAS itself (the MFD will list the available Profile names). The use of multiple game Profiles prepared for each game raises the amount of programmable functions per game to a virtually unlimited amount. This enviable feature is, at present, not found in other HOTAS devices.

== Support ==
Since the acquisition of Saitek in September 2016, Logitech has been providing both Driver and ST programming software support for the X52 and X52 Pro HOTAS devices. Over the years, however, users have reported issues and stability problems regarding the use of Logitech's ST programming software. The old Saitek's Driver and ST programming software are still available at ftp.saitek.com (freely accessible through most FTP clients) and they still work properly today on modern operating systems, such as Windows 10.

Please note: should the user of Logitech's Driver/ST programming software wish to revert to the Saitek's counterparts, a complete removal of the Logitech's Driver/ST programming software plus all related X52 peripherals installed in the System would be mandatory. Failing to do so would prevent the Saitek version of the ST programming software from recognizing the HOTAS, on account of different Hardware IDs imposed by Logitech's Driver. Therefore, to successfully use the ST programming software from Saitek is necessary to also use the companion driver from Saitek.

=== Joystick ===
- Precision centering mechanism, non-contact technology on X and Y axes and constant spring force reduce free play, improve control and increase durability.
- Two-stage metal trigger; two primary buttons in one convenient position
- Four fire buttons including missile launcher with spring-loaded safety cover for instant access
- Conveniently positioned metal pinkie switch provides shift functionality to double up on programmable commands
- Two X eight-way hat switches
- 3D rudder twist
- Three-position rotary mode selector switch with LED indicators
- Three spring-loaded, base-mounted toggle switches for up to six programmable flight commands
- Five-position handle adjustment system to suit all hand sizes

=== Throttle ===
- Progressive throttle with tension adjustment, and two detents for afterburner and idle (set at 90% and 10% respectively)
- Two fire buttons
- Scroll wheel with built-in button
- Mouse controller / hat switch with left mouse button
- Eight-way hat switch
- Two x rotary controls
- Smooth-action slider control
- Clutch button initiates ‘safe mode’ to allow on-the-fly Profile selection, or to display button functionality without activating
