= Data 100 =

Data 100 Corporation
- Formerly: American Data Corporation (1968–1969)
- Founded: December 1968; 57 years ago in Minneapolis, Minnesota, United States
- Founders: Bruce Bambrough; Marvin Bookin; David Jerry Eckberg; Edward Orenstein
- Defunct: July 1978; 47 years ago
- Fate: Acquired by Northern Telecom
- Number of employees: 3,063 (1977, peak)

Data 100 Corporation (originally American Data Corporation) was an American computer hardware company active from 1968 to 1978 and based in Minneapolis, Minnesota. Founded by former employees of Control Data Corporation, Data 100 quickly became a major manufacturer of remote batch terminals and was at one point the largest independent manufacturer of remote job entry equipment. Data 100 competed with IBM, manufacturing IBM-compatible equipment. At its peak, the company had several international subsidiaries and employed over 3,000 workers worldwide. It was acquired by Northern Telecom of Montreal in 1978.

== History ==
Data 100 Corporation was founded as American Data Corporation in December 1968 in Minneapolis, Minnesota, by Bruce Bambrough, Marvin Bookin, David Jerry Eckberg, and Edward Orenstein. All four of its co-founders had previously worked as executives for Control Data Corporation (CDC) in nearby Bloomington before starting their own company. Orenstein, the company's president and chairman, had previously founded another start-up company, Data Display, which manufactured cathode ray tubes for computer applications in 1959. Data Display earned its first contract in 1964 with CDC, who commissioned Data Display to design and manufacture the CRT assembly for the system console of the CDC 6600, which was the world's fastest computer during the latter half of the 1960s. CDC acquired Data Display outright in 1966 and promoted Orenstein to manager of CDC's terminal division.

While working at CDC, Orenstein and the three other co-founders had witnessed the rapid growth of remote job entry equipment and wanted CDC to enter the field with their own line of remote batch terminals to compete with IBM, which had a near-monopoly in the field. When they were met with apathy from CDC's top management, they exited CDC to establish American Data Corporation, with each of the four co-founders pooling US$35,000 of their own money to finance its foundation. Soon after, they attracted $2 million in venture capital and an additional $4 million after filing its initial public offering in early 1969.

American Data Corporation reincorporated itself as Data 100 in February 1969 and unveiled its first product, the Model 70 remote batch terminal, in spring 1969 at the Joint Computer Conference. The Model 70 was a hard-wired clone of the IBM 2780, complete with a 1250-lpm line printer. In order to hasten the production of the Model 70, Data 100 acquired Royal Machine Industries, a fabricator of computer system enclosures based in Edina, Minnesota, between July and October 1969. The Model 70 was succeeded in July 1970 with the Model 78, which was more versatile than its predecessor, featured broader compatibility with IBM's systems, and was optioned with a variety of peripherals, including CRT displays, tape drives, line printers, and card readers. In 1972, Data 100 introduced their first entry in the company's extensive Model 88 series, which was a series of compact remote batch terminals intended for low-volume work. In September 1973, Data 100 introduced both the Model 71 remote batch terminal, the successor to the Model 78 that introduced compatibility with the IBM 3780, itself the enhanced successor to IBM's 2780. Shortly afterward the company introduced the Model 74, a minicomputer intended to compete with IBM's entry-level models in the IBM System/360 family, namely the Models 20 and 30; it could also perform as a remote batch terminal compatible with the 2780 and 3780. Data 100 optioned the Model 74 with Keybatch, a key-to-disk subsystem that allowed data entry directly to 8-inch floppy disk. The Keybatch was also compatible with the Model 78.

Data 100's remote batch terminals, especially those in the Model 70 series, proved very popular among Fortune 500 buyers and allowed Data 100 to become the largest independent vendor of remote job entry equipment by 1974, with a 12 percent market share, trailing only IBM. Despite this, during the first five years of its existence Data 100 reported cumulative losses of $15 million before reporting its first annual profit of $1.9 million in 1973.

Amid the 1969–1970 recession in the United States, the company established an international subsidiary, Data 100 Limited, overseas in London. In March 1970, Data 100 Limited acquired the peripherals division of Chichester-based Scientific Furnishings Limited for its factory in order to expand production of the Model 70 to Europe. Between 1973 and 1974, Data 100 raised a 20,000-square-foot factory in Hemel Hempstead and another 27,000-square-foot factory in Scotland. By 1976, Data 100 had formed additional international subsidiaries in Amsterdam, Australia, Frankfurt, and Toronto and had established a joint venture with Sumitomo of Tokyo. At its peak in 1977, the company employed 3,063 people, owned seven manufacturing plants, and had 64 branch offices worldwide.

In September 1975, Data 100 acquired Iomec, Inc., a manufacturer of hard disk drives (HDDs) based in Santa Clara, California, founded earlier in 1969. It later shuttered the Iomec factory in August 1976, Data 100 citing a downswing in the HDD industry.

In November 1977, Bambrough was ousted as vice president of Data 100, while remaining on the board of directors. In April 1978, Data 100 introduced its final system as an independent company, the ambitious Model 85. It was their attempt to get into the standalone electronic data processing field and was capable of running IBM RPG.

In May 1978, the aerospace company McDonnell Douglas of St. Louis, Missouri, made a bid to acquire Data 100 in a stock swap valued at $145 million. In July that year, Northern Telecom (Nortel) of Montreal counteroffered with a slightly higher bid, with Data 100 ultimately agreeing to Nortel's offer on July 10. By September 1978 the acquisition was finalized. It was Nortel's second acquisition of a terminal manufacturer that year, after purchasing Sycor the previous May. In 1979, Nortel established Northern Telecom Systems Corporation (NTSC) in the United States, with Sycor and Data 100 becoming subsidiaries of NTSC.

== See also ==
- Lee Data, a terminal manufacturer founded by ex–Data 100 employees
