= Overland Storage =

Overland Storage Inc.
- Type: Public
- Traded as: Nasdaq: OVRL
- Industry: Data storage
- Founded: 1980; 46 years ago
- Defunct: 2025
- Fate: Defunct
- Headquarters: San Diego, California and San Jose, California
- Key people: Scott McClendon (chairman); Eric Kelly (president & CEO)
- Products: Disk-based and tape-based data storage
- Revenue: ▼59.46 million USD (2012)
- Parent: Sphere 3D Corp.

Overland Storage Inc. was a manufacturer of data storage products, including tape, disk and NAS. It acquired Tandberg Data shortly before being acquired by Sphere 3D itself. The two subsidiaries were later rebranded under the common Overland-Tandberg brand.

== History ==
It was founded in 1980 as "Overland Data" in San Diego, California, and is a provider of data protection appliances for midrange and distributed enterprises. Overland’s products include NEO SERIES tape libraries, REO SERIES disk-based appliances with Virtual Tape Library (VTL) capabilities, Snap SAN storage area network-based appliances and SnapServer network-attached storage-based appliances. Overland sells its products through leading OEMs, commercial distributors, storage integrators and value-added resellers.

Overland originally manufactured IBM-compatible 9-track tape drives. In January 2000, Overland acquired Tecmar and its line of small system tape drives including the WangTek and WangDAT brands. Following smaller acquisitions of disk-based product lines (including startup Zetta Systems in 2005), in June 2008, Overland acquired Snap Server from Adaptec.

In January 2009, Eric Kelly, a board member since 2007 and the head of its recently acquired SnapServer NAS line, became CEO of Overland Storage. Other executive team changes in 2009 included Jillian Mansolf, formerly of Dell Inc., Maxtor and Data Robotics Inc., as the new vice president of worldwide sales and marketing; Geoff Barrall, formerly the CEO and founder of Data Robotics Inc. and BlueArc, as chief technology officer and vice president of engineering and Chris Gopal, most recently of Dell, as vice president of operations.

In February 2010, Overland debuted the latest in its SnapServer SAN line, Snap SAN S2000, the company's first iSCSI SAN. Later that month, Overland debuted LTO-5 technology across its NEO line of enterprise tape libraries, becoming the first company to offer the newer, faster tape technology to customers.

In mid-summer 2010, Overland opened the doors to a new Silicon Valley office in San Jose, California. In July 2010, Overland unveiled the SnapServer N2000, a block-and-file-level NAS or SAN package aimed at virtualized environments running VMware, Microsoft Hyper-V or Citrix XenServer. N2000 is integrated for Microsoft Windows and Unix and can scale up to 144 TB in a 2U form factor. Also in July, Overland unveiled the NEO 8000e, an enhanced version of the company's NEO 8000 series of enterprise tape libraries, that with LTO-5, scales up to 3 PB of capacity and has a data transfer rate of 24 TB per hour.

=== Timeline ===
- 2000 - Overland Data acquires Tecmar, a manufacturer of tape drives.
- 2002 - Overland Data renamed to Overland Storage.
- 2005 - Overland Storage acquires Zetta Systems, a small software developer, to grow disk-based backup business.
- 2008 - Overland Storage acquires SnapServer line-of-business from Adaptec.
- 2014 - Overland Storage acquires Tandberg Data with operations in Dortmund, Germany.
- 2014 - Overland Storage merges with Sphere3d.
- 2018 - Sphere3d spins off Overland Storage.
- 2025 - Tandberg Data liquidated
- 2025 - Overland Storage ceases operations

== Current Products ==
SnapServer network-attached storage (NAS) and Snap SAN storage area network (SAN) are disk-based data storage from 1TB to hundreds of terabytes and are designed for remote offices, workgroups, departments, and distributed enterprises.

- SnapSAN S5000
- SnapSAN S3000
- SnapServer N2000
- SnapServer DX2
- SnapServer DX1
- SnapServer 410
- SnapServer 210

REO Series: Disk-based backup and recovery

- REO 4600

NEO Series: Tape backup and archive

- NEO 8000e
- NEO 4000e
- NEO 2000e
- NEO 400s
- NEO 200s
- NEO 100s

== Legacy Products ==
NEO Series:

- NEO 8000
- NEO 4000 (OEM-ed by HP as MSL6060)
- NEO 2000 (also HP MSL6030)

== See also ==
- Computer data storage
- Network-attached storage
- Storage area network
- Tape backup
