= WangDAT =

American computer hardware company

WangDAT, Inc.

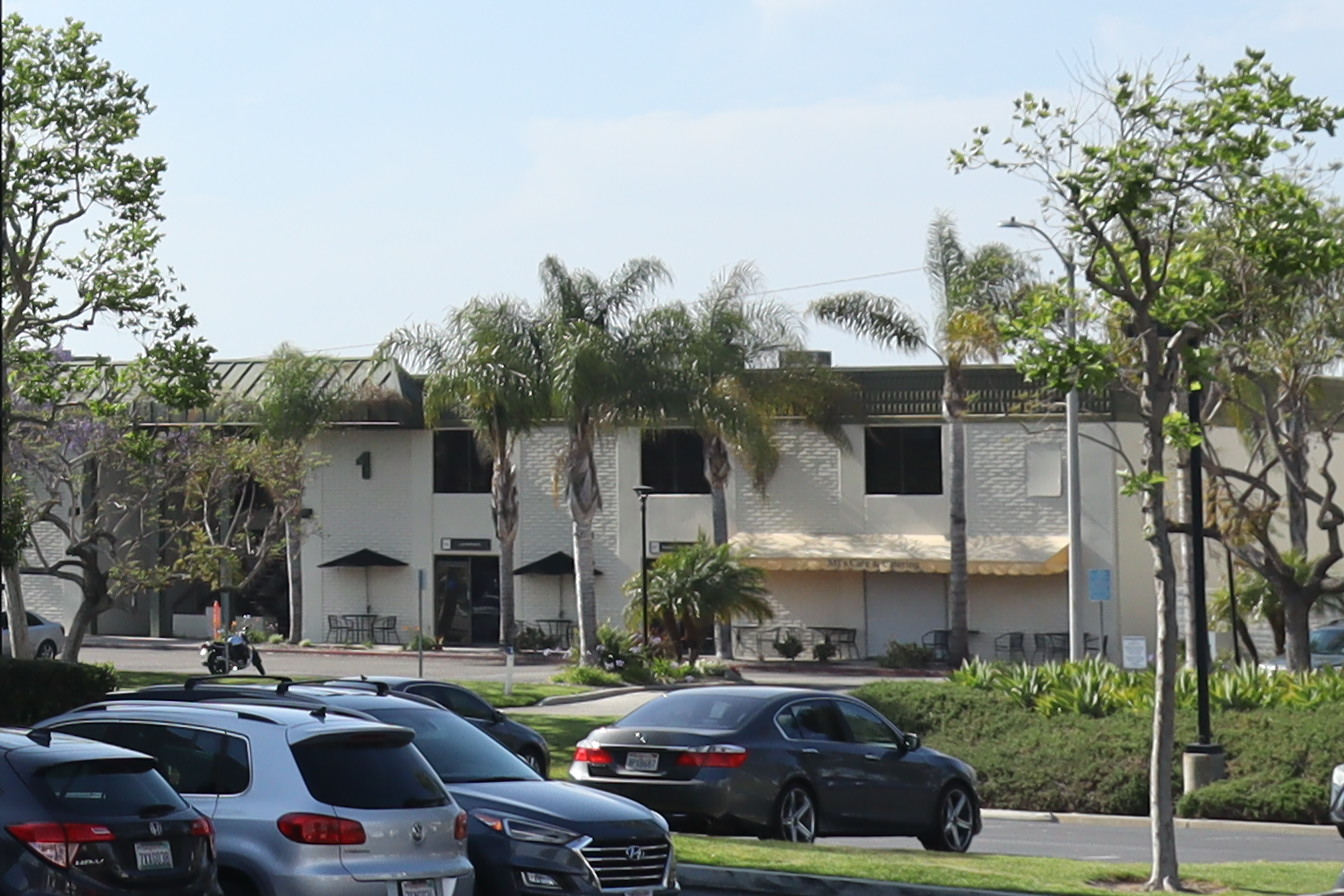
- Former original headquarters in Costa Mesa, California, pictured in 2022
- Type: Private
- Industry: Computer hardware
- Founded: 1987; 39 years ago in Costa Mesa, California, United States
- Founder: Ben C. Wang
- Defunct: December 1991; 34 years ago
- Fate: Acquired by Rexon
- Headquarters: Irvine, California (1990–2001)
- Products: Tape drives

WangDAT, Inc., was an American computer hardware company independently active from 1987 to 1991 and based in Orange County, California. The company was an early and important manufacturer of magnetic-tape data storage systems based on the normally audio-only Digital Audio Tape (DAT) specification. WangDAT introduced the first DAT-based tape drive compatible with half-height, 5.25-inch drive bays, allowing it to be housed fully within a typical desktop computer of the time regardless of size, giving it a significant advantage over major competitors such as Sony and Hewlett-Packard. WangDAT was founded by Ben C. Wang as his third tape drive start-up and fourth overall. It was acquired by Rexon in December 1991. Products with the WangDAT brand continued to be sold into at least 2001.

== History ==
WangDAT, Inc., was founded in Costa Mesa, California, in 1987 by Ben C. Wang. WangDAT was Wang's third start-up company in the tape drive industry and fourth start-up overall. A Shanghai-born engineer who had emigrated to the United States in 1948, Wang had worked for several computer companies including IBM for over ten years starting in 1958 before founding his own companies, Wangco and Wangtek. He founded Wangco in 1969 to manufacture IBM-compatible tape drives; it was acquired by Perkin-Elmer in 1976. He then founded Wangtek in 1982 as a subsidiary of his other company Rexon, which manufactured bespoke minicomputers for businesses; he later spun off Wangtek and sold it to Hambrecht & Quist (H&Q) in 1986.

Originally planning to retire from entrepreneurship following his divestiture of Wangtek, Wang changed his mind after hearing rumors in late 1987 about the development of a new industry standard for magnetic-tape data storage, Digital Data Storage (DDS). DDS was jointly developed by Sony and Hewlett-Packard (HP) and used Digital Audio Tape (DAT), originally designed for high-fidelity digital audio recording, for data storage. Through the DDS standard, a standard DAT cartridge could be repurposed to store roughly 1.3 GB of data at US$10 per cartridge—a "quantum jump" in value proposition, according to Wang, especially when compared to contemporary established magnetic-tape data storage formats as well as then-burgeoning optical storage systems. By the time DSS was announced to the public in February 1988, Wang had already raised $5 million in venture capital from investment banks H&Q and Oxford Partners to bring his own DAT-based tape drive to market at a sub-$1,000 price point, undercutting both HP and Sony. (Note: By 1991, WangDAT had raised a total of $8 million in venture capital.) Despite having patents pending on his own design, Wang avoided announcing his product first before HP and Sony, determining that the establishment of an industry standard by two computing stalwarts through DDS brought legitimacy to the notion of DAT-based data storage, which he considered more important than being a disruptive innovator.

While diverging radically from HP and Sony's designs, WangDAT pledged full data compatibility with their DDS standard. In designing its first product, WangDAT developed custom ASICs for mechanical control and SCSI connection, allowing for the miniaturization of the drive's physical footprint. This allowed the company to introduce the Model 1300, the first ever half-height, 5.25-inch DAT drive, able to fit within any open 5.25-inch drive bay on the smallest of desktop computers. This gave WangDAT a major edge over HP and Sony's DDS drives, which were full-height units, owing to them borrowing the design and drive mechanics for their DDS drives from Sony's DAT audio players largely wholesale. In December 1989, WangDAT scored its first design win with Mountain Computer, who agreed to purchase WangDAT's drives for their FileSafe storage subsystems entirely on the merit of WangDAT's drives conforming to the half-height form factor. WangDAT continued to emphasize miniaturization to stay competitive; for example, in October 1991, WangDAT introduced the LD4 AutoLoader, the first ever DAT autoloader in a 5.25-inch form factor, able to hold up to four cartridges in a magazine while being able to fit entirely within a desktop computer.

By early 1990, WangDAT emerged as a strong contender in the nascent DAT-based data storage market, competing with not only HP and Sony but also Wang's previous start-up Wangtek, which developed its own DAT-based data storage systems independently. Industry analysts in 1990 estimated WangDAT's total market share between 11 and 17 percent of the $50 million global market. (Note: Wang himself claimed that WangDAT's market share was closer to 30 percent, excluding drives produced by HP for their own systems, which were not sold separately.) In September 1990, Wang hired Amyl Ahola, previously a VP at Seagate Technology, to replace him as president and CEO of WangDAT, with Wang retaining himself as chairman. Under Aloha's leadership, WangDAT achieved its first quarterly profit in March 1991. Revenue grew from $7.5 million in 1990 to a projected $20 million in 1991. To accommodate this growth, the company relocated its headquarters to Irvine, California, occupying a 28,000-square-foot facility in the Irvine Spectrum.

Amid a slowdown in the DAT-based data storage market, in October 1991 WangDAT agreed to be acquired by Rexon. The acquisition was finalized in December 1991, with WangDAT becoming a business unit under Wangtek, which Rexon had acquired back from H&Q earlier in 1991. For the acquisition, WangDAT's shareholders received $12 million in a combined stock swap and cash transaction. The acquisition was intended to combine WangDAT's specialized focus with Rexon's larger customer base and established foothold in the quarter-inch cartridge (QIC) drive market. Under the new organizational structure, WangDAT became Rexon's dedicated DAT subsidiary, absorbing Wangtek's existing DAT product lines. Meanwhile, Ahola retained his role as CEO of WangDAT's Irvine headquarters. This agreement marked the first significant consolidation within the DAT-based data storage market and put Rexon at second place in market share, tied with HP's 26-percent share but under Archive Corporation's 30-percent share.

Rexon itself was acquired by Overland Storage in 2000. Into at least 2001, Overland continued selling drives under the WangDAT brand.
