= Sycor =

Early programmable terminal and desktop computer manufacturer

Sycor, Inc.
- Formerly: Systronics, Inc.
- Industry: Computer equipment manufacturing
- Founded: 1967
- Defunct: 1978
- Fate: Acquired by Northern Telecom
- Headquarters: Ann Arbor, MI, USA

Sycor, Inc. (originally Systronics, Inc.) was an American computer company founded in 1967 and based in Ann Arbor, Michigan. It mainly produced early programmable intelligent terminals usable as desktop computers. It was acquired by Northern Telecom in 1978.

== Products ==
=== Systronics Key-Cassette and Video Terminal (1968) ===
The Systronics Key-Cassette terminal was announced in July 1968 at $18000 per unit ($6000/unit in larger quantities), with first deliveries commencing in September that same year. The Key-Cassette, much like the Datapoint 2200, was a desktop terminal with an integrated keyboard, CRT display, processor, and two cassette tape drives. One was used for data storage, and another stored a program that would be read by the terminal when invoked. The advertised use of the program cassette was to run software provided by the company termed "Teachware," which claimed to teach the operator how to use the terminal, "and is reported to allow an untrained person to become operational within a few hours," according to one article.

The Video Terminal was very similar to the Key-Cassette, only lacking the cassette drives (although these could be re-added optionally) and was pre-programmed to replace a dumb terminal or teletype such as an ASR-33.

=== Sycor 301 and 302 (1969) ===
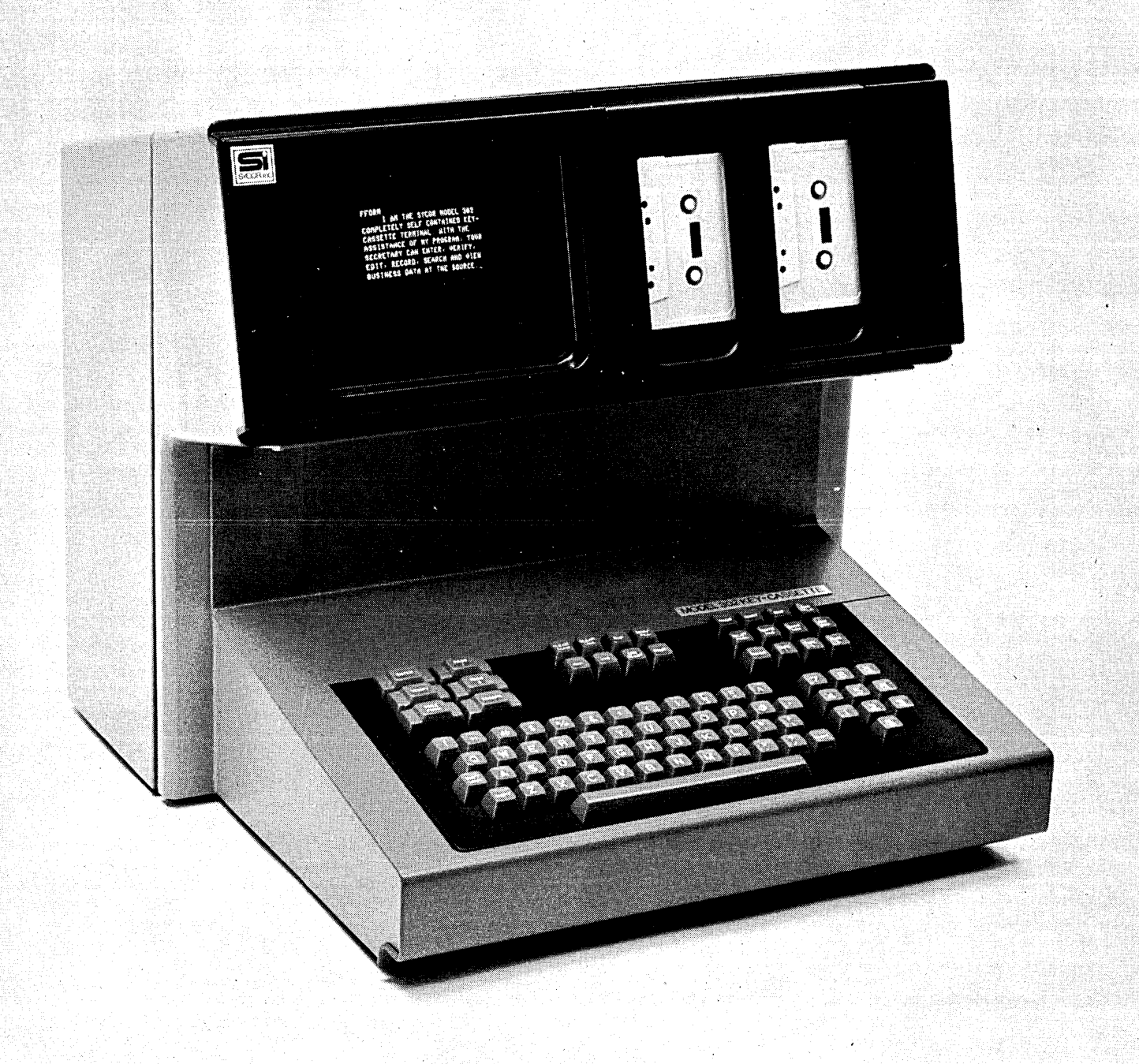
A 1969 Sycor 302 unit.

The Sycor 302 was introduced in early 1969 as an upgrade to the original Key-Cassette system introduced the year prior, and cost much less per unit at only $7900. The 301 was a lower-cost version of the 302 at $7000/unit, and included only one cassette drive as opposed to the 302's dual drives. Both were advertised as "programmable data terminal[s]," and that "each one contains a mini-computer which can be custom programmed to match its intended use."

Also like the Datapoint 2200, it was advertised as being able to emulate other terminals through the program cassette without needing to modify any hardware. According to a contemporaneous report, the first delivery of this system took place in February 1969, over two years prior to the 2200's first shipment, yet with similar features and price point.

A specialized variant of this system with a custom keyboard layout and no cassettes drives, referred to as the Securities Terminal, was advertised in late 1969 for use by stock brokers, and was in use at the New York Stock Exchange and the American Stock Exchange by the end of that same year.

=== Sycor 340 (1971) ===
The Sycor 340 terminal was announced in early 1971, and continued production until at least the late 1970s. By the time of the 340's introduction, the terminal's programming language had been given a name, TAL (Terminal Application Language). Similar in appearance to the previous units, this model was their most popular by 1978, with half of all 40,000 Sycor systems installed being 340s.

Variants of the 340 were also offered, such as the floppy-drive-equipped 340D, a higher-capacity cassette model termed the 340E, and an overall upgraded version termed the 350 (introduced in June 1975). The 350 also had variants with integrated printers of varying speeds, from 60 characters per second to 300 lines per minute.

== See also ==
- Datapoint 2200, an intelligent terminal announced in 1970 with similar features to the Sycor 302
- Data 100, sister company to Sycor following acquisition by Northern Telecom
