= Basic/Four =

Business Basic variety

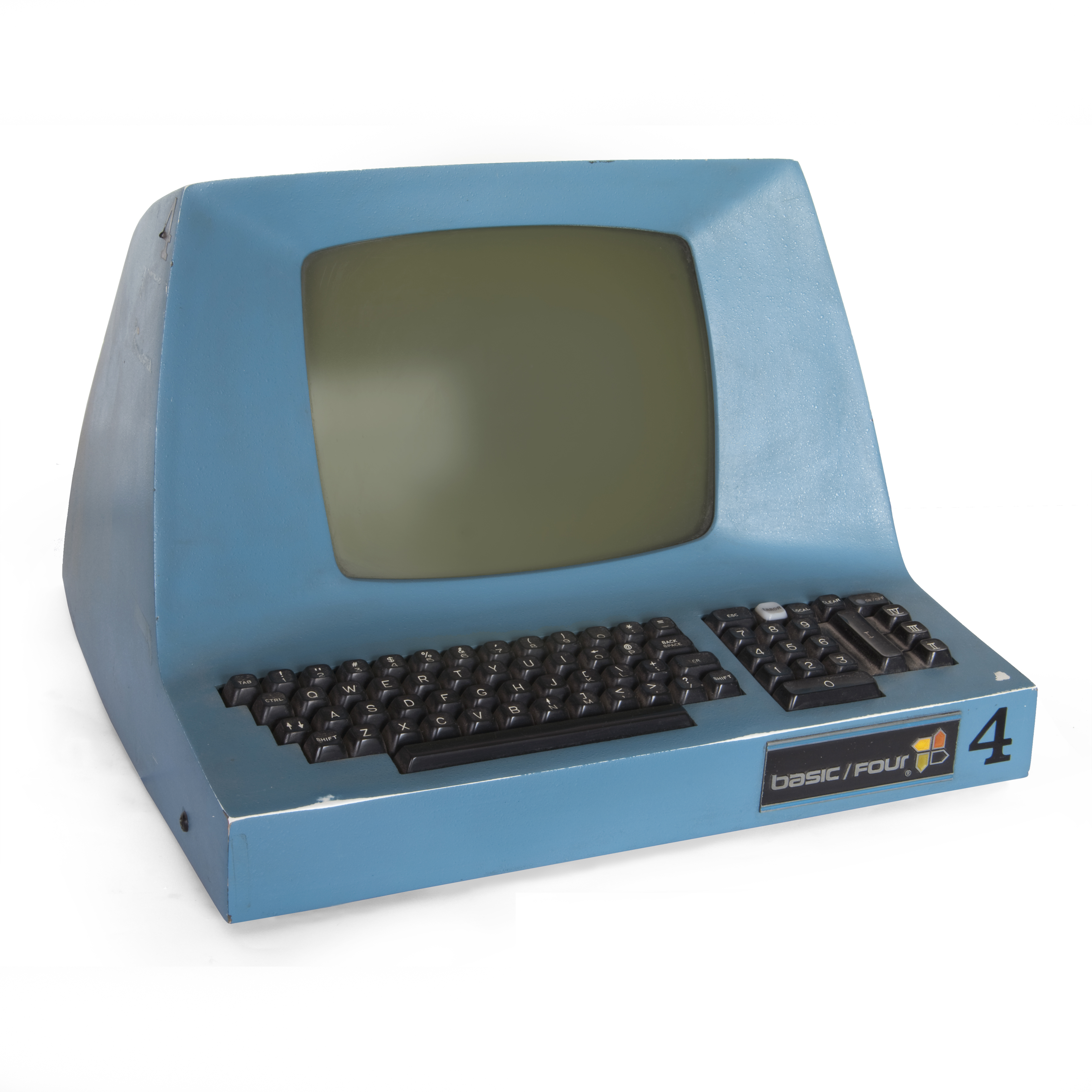
Terminal for a MAI Basic/Four minicomputer

Basic/Four is a variety of Business Basic which originally ran on computers of the same name introduced in 1971. The company that produced the system, Management Assistance, Inc., was later known as Basic/Four Corporation, MAI Basic Four, Inc., and MAI Basic Four Information Systems. Basic/Four set the pattern for the business BASIC market, with similar products appearing on other minicomputer systems, and later, microcomputers like the Apple III. It remained a popular product into the early 1980s, when increasingly powerful micros replaced it, and MAI turned to selling pre-packaged Basic/Four like accounting software.

Basic/Four Corporation was created as a subsidiary of Management Assistance, Inc. in Irvine, California in 1971. Basic/Four initially sold small business minicomputers that were assembled from Microdata Corporation CPUs, but in 1976 they began selling their own 16-bit CPU designs. Over the next three years they introduced a series of models of these designs, the 200 through 730, with various configurations of memory, terminal servers and hard drive. By the end of 1978 they had approximately 6000 systems in the field in total.

Basic Four was one of the first commercially available business BASIC interpreters. The computers ran an operating system with the BASIC interpreter integrated, known as BOSS. The BASIC interpreter was written in TREE-META.

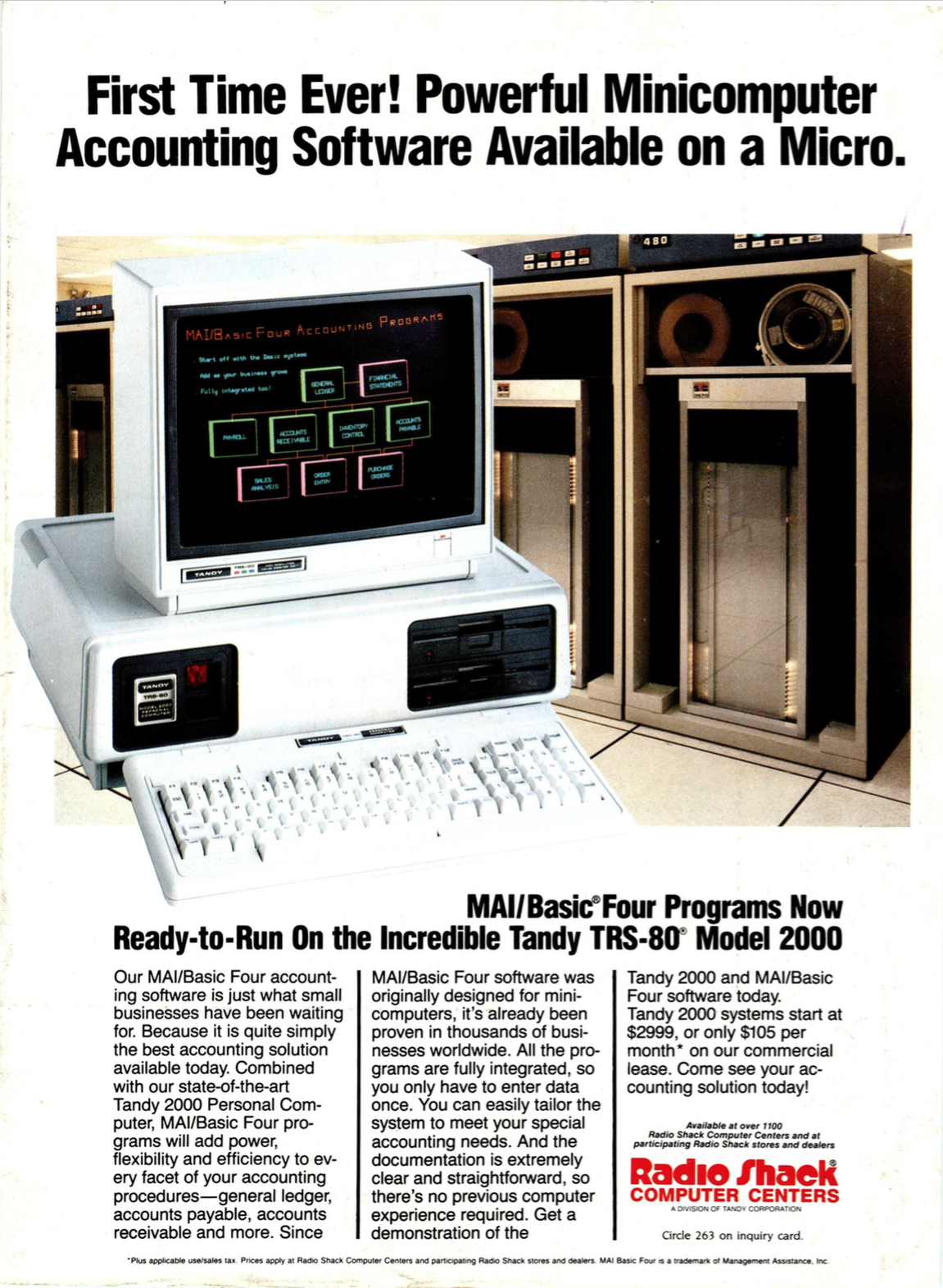
1984 ad co-marketing "MAI/Basic Four" software with the Tandy 2000 personal computer

The takeover of the low-end and midrange market by the IBM PC during the mid-1980s led to a crash in sales of MAI's 16-bit designs. In 1985, Wall Street financier Bennett S. LeBow purchased the company after it had experienced significant operating financial losses. In the mid-1980s, the company released accounting software for third-party microcomputers, and in 1988 it released its own 80286-based workstation. The Basic4 system was utilized by many small banks and credit unions.

In 1988, LeBow used the company as a platform for an unsuccessful attempted hostile takeover of much larger Prime Computer. In 1990, the company changed its name to MAI Systems Corporation and changed its business to be a system integrator instead of a combined hardware and software manufacturer, reselling third-party computers but installing their own customer-specific software system.

MAI Systems Corporation became a wholly owned subsidiary of Softbrands Inc. in 2006.

== See also ==
- MAI Systems Corp. v. Peak Computer, Inc.
