= AMD =

American multinational semiconductor company

Advanced Micro Devices, Inc.

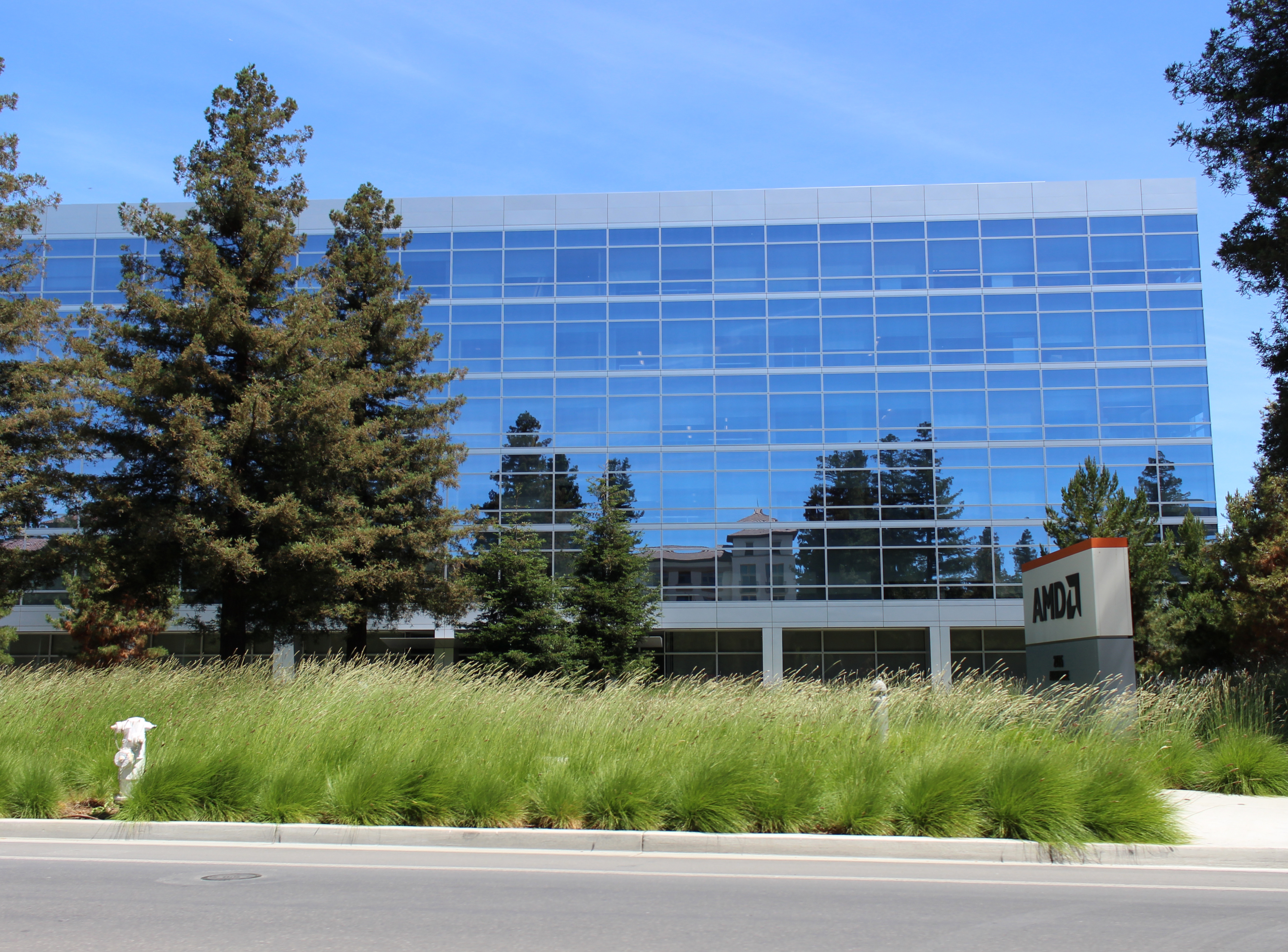
- Headquarters in Santa Clara, California, in 2020
- Trade name: AMD
- Type: Public
- Traded as: Nasdaq: AMD; Nasdaq-100 component; S&P 100 component; S&P 500 component
- Industry: Semiconductors; Computer hardware
- Founded: May 1, 1969; 57 years ago
- Founder: Team led by Jerry Sanders
- Headquarters: Santa Clara, California, U.S.
- Area served: Worldwide
- Key people: Lisa Su (chair & CEO); Mark Papermaster (CTO); Jean Hu (CFO); Phil Guido (CCO)
- Products: AMD CPUs; AMD GPUs; AMD FPGAs
- Brands: Ryzen; Radeon; Athlon; Opteron; Epyc; Threadripper; Virtex; Vivado; Sempron; Duron; AMD Instinct
- Revenue: ▲US$34.6 billion (2025)
- Operating income: ▲US$3.69 billion (2025)
- Net income: ▲US$4.34 billion (2025)
- Total assets: ▲US$76.9 billion (2025)
- Total equity: ▲US$63.0 billion (2025)
- Number of employees: c. 31,000 (2025)
- Website: amd.com

Advanced Micro Devices, Inc. (AMD) is an American multinational semiconductor company headquartered in Santa Clara, California. It develops central processing units (CPUs), graphics processing units (GPUs), field-programmable gate arrays (FPGAs), system-on-chips (SoCs), and high-performance computer components. AMD serves a wide range of business and consumer markets, including personal computers (PCs), gaming, data centers, and embedded systems.

AMD's main products include microprocessors, embedded processors, and graphics processors for servers, workstations, PCs, and embedded system applications, as well as chipsets for motherboards. The company has also expanded into new markets, such as data centers, gaming, and high-performance computing. AMD's processors are used in a wide range of computing devices, including PCs, servers, laptops, and gaming consoles. Initially manufacturing its own processors, the company outsourced its manufacturing after GlobalFoundries was spun off in 2009. Through its Xilinx acquisition in 2022, AMD offers field-programmable gate array (FPGA) products.

AMD was founded in 1969 by Jerry Sanders and a group of his fellow Fairchild Semiconductor colleagues. The company's early products were primarily memory chips and other computer components. In 1975, AMD entered the microprocessor market, competing with Intel, its main rival in the industry, by reverse-engineering Intel's 8080. This led to the initial cross-license agreement allowing AMD to build legal clones of Intel processors, including the x86 family of processors from 1981. The two companies fought a seven-year legal battle after Intel refused to share the blueprint of their i386 with AMD, ending in the latter's favor in 1994 but requiring AMD to develop their own x86 microprocessors in-house. In the early 2000s, AMD experienced significant growth and success, partly due to its strong position in the PC market and its Athlon and Opteron processors. The company faced challenges in the late 2000s and early 2010s, as it struggled to compete with Intel.

In the late 2010s, AMD regained market share by pursuing a penetration pricing strategy for its Ryzen processors, offering competitive performance and lower costs than Intel microprocessors. In 2022, AMD surpassed Intel by market capitalization for the first time.

== History ==
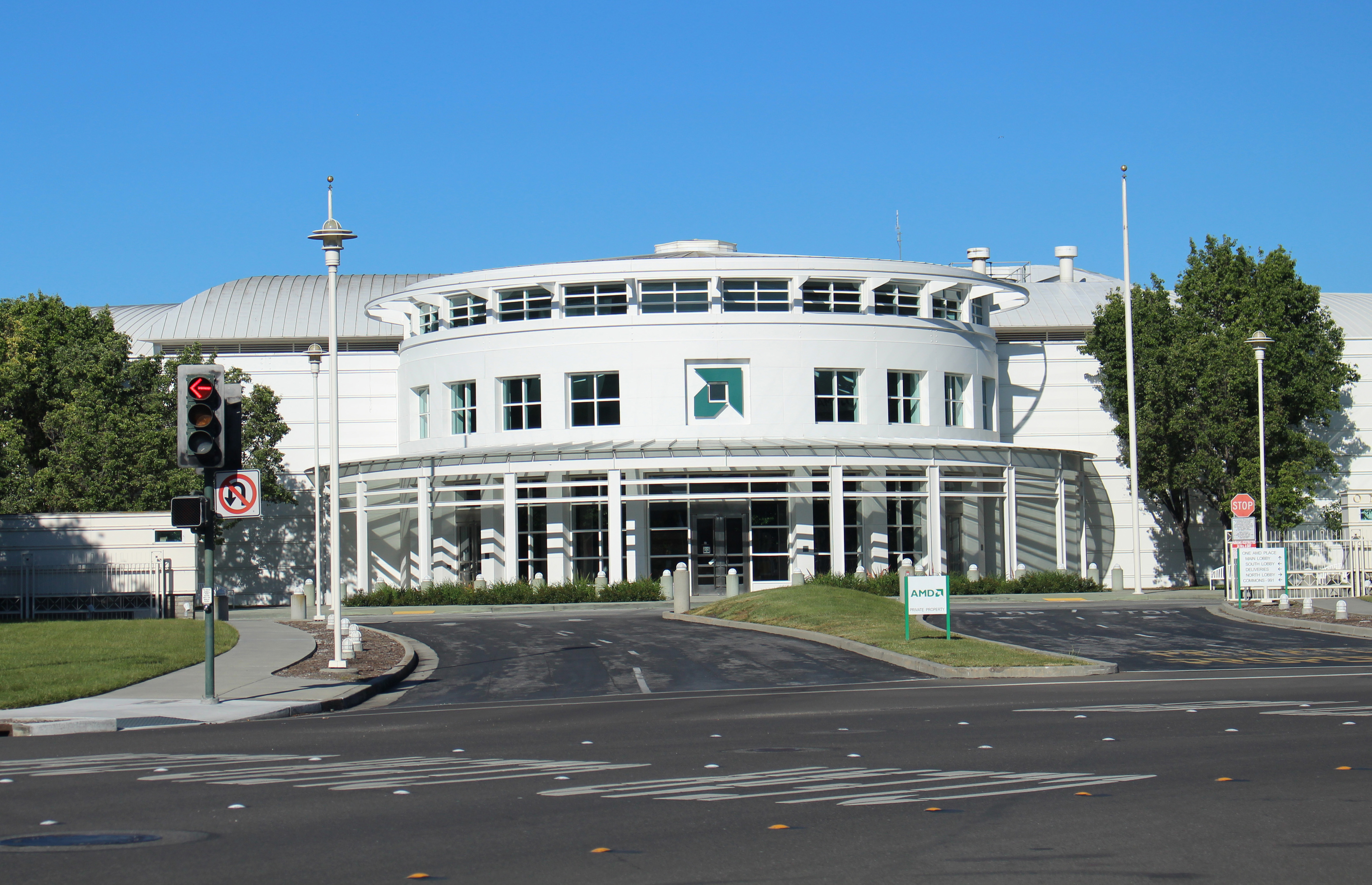
AMD's former headquarters in Sunnyvale, California (demolished in 2019)

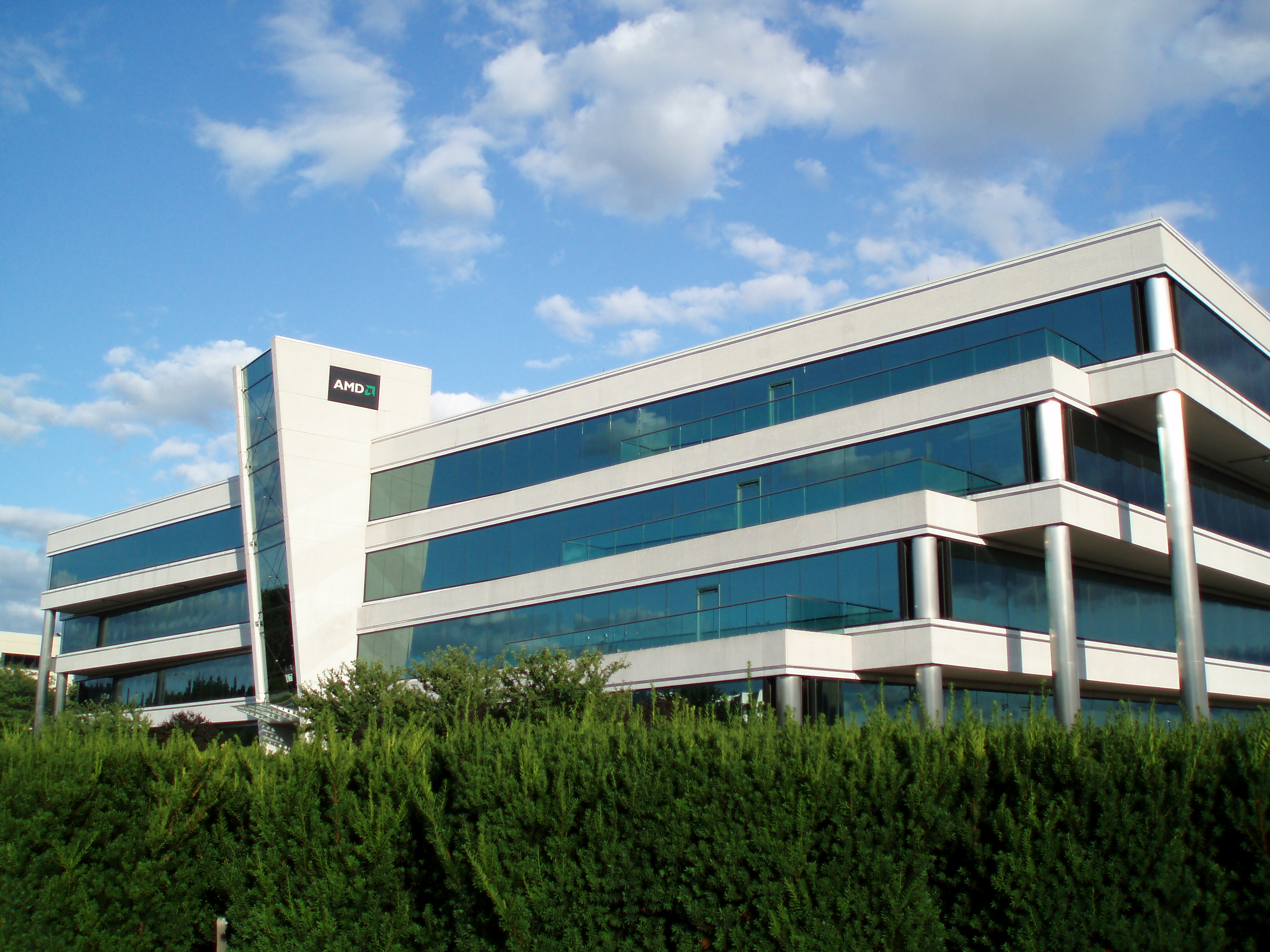
AMD's campus in Markham, Ontario, Canada, ATI's former headquarters

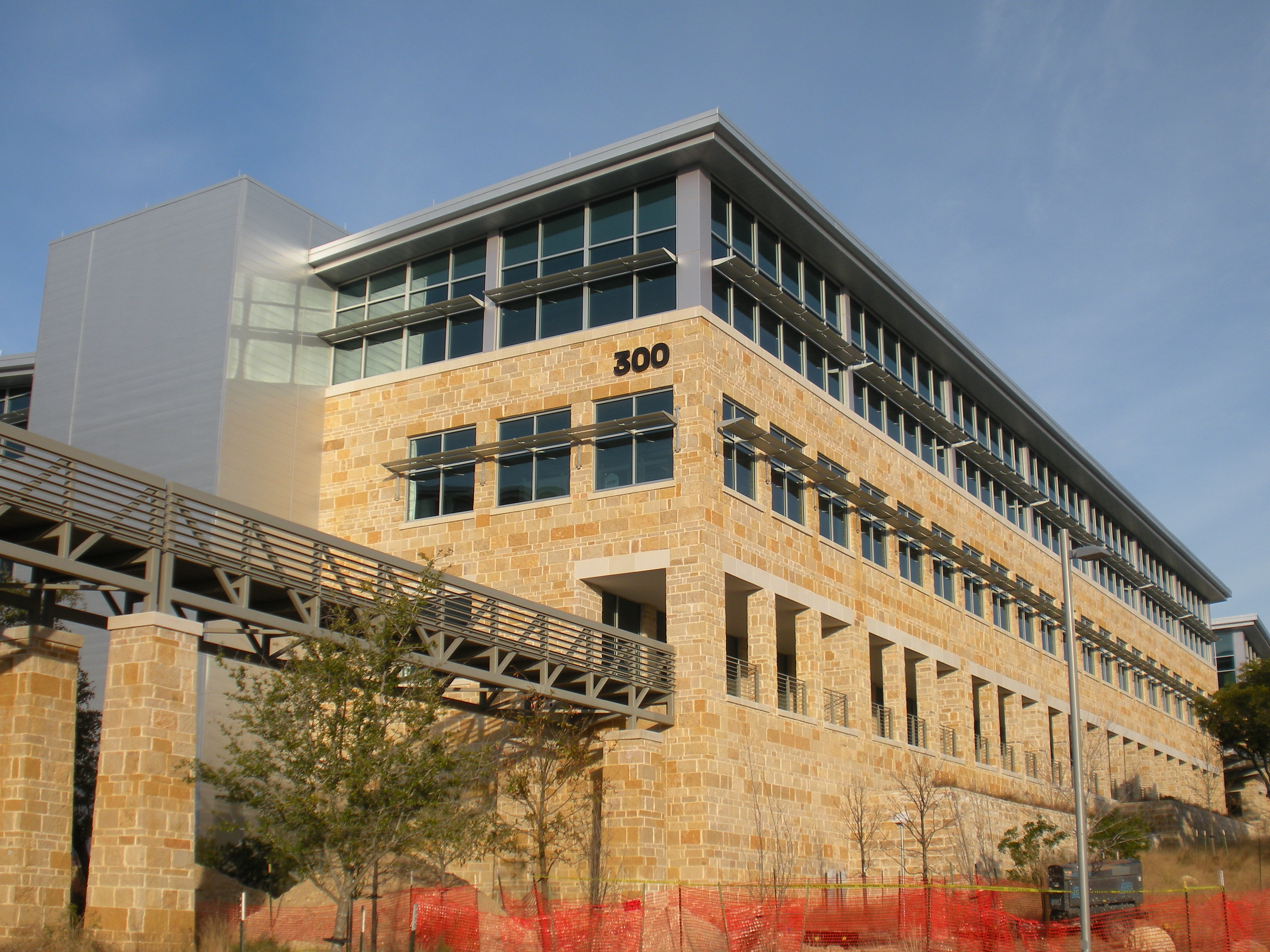
AMD's LEED-certified Lone Star campus in Austin, Texas

=== Foundational years ===
Advanced Micro Devices was formally incorporated by Jerry Sanders, along with seven of his colleagues from Fairchild Semiconductor—Ed Turney; John Carey; Sven Simonsen; Jack Gifford, and three members of his team: Frank Botte, Jim Giles, and Larry Stenger, on May 1, 1969. Sanders, an electrical engineer who was the director of marketing at Fairchild, had, like many of its executives, grown frustrated with the increasing lack of support, opportunity, and flexibility within the company. He later decided to leave to start his own semiconductor company, following the footsteps of Robert Noyce (developer of the first silicon integrated circuit at Fairchild in 1959) and Gordon Moore, who together founded the semiconductor company Intel in July 1968.

In September 1969, AMD moved from its temporary location in Santa Clara to its new $500,000 15,000sqft headquarters at 901 Thompson Place, Sunnyvale, which housed the entire company, including the 8-mask, 7 μm feature size, 2-inch diameter wafer production. To immediately secure a customer base, AMD initially became a second source supplier of microchips designed by Fairchild (the 5 V TTL "9300" logic series) and National Semiconductor. AMD first focused on producing logic chips. The company guaranteed quality control to United States Military Standard, an advantage in the early computer industry since unreliability in microchips was a distinct problem that customers – including computer manufacturers, the telecommunications industry, and instrument manufacturers – wanted to avoid.

April 1970 advertisement
"Commercial-priced ICs are 100% MIL-tested" (Note: MIL testing procedures (100% temperature cycling, baking, hermetic seal testing, centrifuging), but for commercial temperature range (0 °C - 75 °C))
Name	Description	commercial	military
9300	parallel load 4-bit shift register	$6.05	$9.75
9301	1:10 demultiplexer	$6.25	$9.35
9304	dual full adder	$7.50	$10.25
9309	dual 4:1 multiplexer	$5.30	$7.95
9312	8:1 multiplexer	$5.30	$7.95
9310	decade counter	$11.75	$16
9316	4-bit binary counter	$11.75	$16

In November 1969, the company manufactured its first product: the Am9300, a 4-bit MSI shift register, which began selling in 1970. Also in 1970, AMD produced its first proprietary product, the Am2501 logic counter, which was highly successful. Its bestselling product in 1971 was the Am2505, the fastest multiplier available.

In 1971, AMD entered the RAM chip market, beginning with the Am3101, a 64-bit bipolar RAM. That year AMD also greatly increased the sales volume of its linear integrated circuits, and by year-end the company's total annual sales reached US$4.6 million.

AMD went public in September 1972. The company was a second source for Intel MOS/LSI circuits by 1973, with products such as Am14/1506 and Am14/1507, dual 100-bit dynamic shift registers. By 1975, AMD was producing 212 products – of which 49 were proprietary, including the Am9102 (a static N-channel 1024-bit RAM) and three low-power Schottky MSI circuits: Am25LS07, Am25LS08, and Am25LS09.

Intel had created the first microprocessor, its 4-bit 4004, in 1971. By 1975, AMD entered the microprocessor market with the Am9080, a reverse-engineered clone of the Intel 8080, and the Am2900 bit-slice microprocessor family. When Intel began installing microcode in its microprocessors in 1976, it entered into a cross-licensing agreement with AMD, which was granted a copyright license to the microcode in its microprocessors and peripherals, effective October 1976.

In 1977, AMD entered into a joint venture with Siemens, a German engineering conglomerate wishing to enhance its technology expertise and enter the American market. Siemens purchased 20% of AMD's stock, giving the company an infusion of cash to increase its product lines. The two companies also jointly established Advanced Micro Computers (AMC), located in Silicon Valley and in Germany, allowing AMD to enter the microcomputer development and manufacturing field, in particular based on AMD's second-source Zilog Z8000 microprocessors. When the two companies' vision for Advanced Micro Computers diverged, AMD bought out Siemens' stake in the American division in 1979. AMD closed Advanced Micro Computers in late 1981 after switching focus to manufacturing second-source Intel x86 microprocessors.

Total sales in fiscal year 1978 topped $100 million, and in 1979, AMD debuted on the New York Stock Exchange. In 1979, production also began on AMD's new semiconductor fabrication plant in Austin, Texas; the company already had overseas assembly facilities in Penang and Manila, and began construction on a fabrication plant in San Antonio in 1981. In 1980, AMD began supplying semiconductor products for telecommunications, an industry undergoing rapid expansion and innovation.

=== Intel partnership ===
Intel had introduced the first x86 microprocessors in 1978. In 1981, IBM created its personal computer, and wanted Intel's x86 processors, but only under the condition that Intel would also provide a second-source manufacturer for its patented x86 microprocessors. Intel and AMD entered into a 10-year technology exchange agreement, first signed in October 1981 and formally executed in February 1982. The terms of the agreement were that each company could acquire the right to become a second-source manufacturer of semiconductor products developed by the other; that is, each party could "earn" the right to manufacture and sell a product developed by the other, if agreed to, by exchanging the manufacturing rights to a product of equivalent technical complexity. The technical information and licenses needed to make and sell a part would be exchanged for a royalty to the developing company. The 1982 agreement also extended the 1976 AMD–Intel cross-licensing agreement through 1995. The agreement included the right to invoke arbitration of disagreements, and after five years the right of either party to end the agreement with one year's notice. The main result of the 1982 agreement was that AMD became a second-source manufacturer of Intel's x86 microprocessors and related chips, and Intel provided AMD with database tapes for its 8086, 80186, and 80286 chips. However, in the event of a bankruptcy or takeover of AMD, the cross-licensing agreement would be effectively canceled.

Beginning in 1982, AMD began volume-producing second-source Intel-licensed 8086, 8088, 80186, and 80188 processors, and by 1984, its own Am286 clone of Intel's 80286 processor, for the rapidly growing market of IBM PCs and IBM clones. It also continued its successful concentration on proprietary bipolar chips.

The company continued to spend greatly on research and development, and created the world's first 512K EPROM in 1984. That year, AMD was listed in the book The 100 Best Companies to Work for in America, and later made the Fortune 500 list for the first time in 1985.

By mid-1985, the microchip market experienced a severe downturn, mainly due to long-term aggressive trade practices (dumping) from Japan, but also due to a crowded and non-innovative chip market in the United States. AMD rode out the mid-1980s crisis by aggressively innovating and modernizing, devising the Liberty Chip program of designing and manufacturing one new chip or chipset per week for 52 weeks in fiscal year 1986, and by heavily lobbying the U.S. government until sanctions and restrictions were put in place to prevent predatory Japanese pricing. During this time, AMD withdrew from the DRAM market, and made some headway into the CMOS market, which it had lagged in entering, having focused instead on bipolar chips.

AMD had some success in the mid-1980s with the AMD7910 and AMD7911 "World Chip" FSK modem, one of the first multi-standard devices that covered both Bell and CCITT tones at up to 1200 baud half duplex or 300/300 full duplex. Beginning in 1986, AMD embraced the perceived shift toward RISC with its own AMD Am29000 (29k) processor; the 29k survived as an embedded processor. The company also increased its EPROM memory market share in the late 1980s. Throughout the 1980s, AMD was a second-source supplier of Intel x86 processors. In 1991, it introduced its 386-compatible Am386, an AMD-designed chip. Creating its own chips, AMD began to compete directly with Intel.

In January 1996, AMD acquired NexGen for $857 million to develop what eventually became AMD K6. At the time, NexGen was working on its Nx686 microprocessor.

AMD had a large, successful flash memory business, even during the dotcom bust. In 2003, to divest some manufacturing and aid its overall cash flow, which was under duress from aggressive microprocessor competition from Intel, AMD spun off its flash memory business and manufacturing into Spansion, a joint venture with Fujitsu, which had been co-manufacturing flash memory with AMD since 1993. In December 2005, AMD divested itself of Spansion to focus on the microprocessor market, and Spansion went public in an IPO.

=== 2006–2019 ===
On July 24, 2006, AMD announced its acquisition of the Canadian 3D graphics card company ATI Technologies. AMD paid $4.3 billion and 58 million shares of its stock, for approximately $5.4 billion. The transaction was completed on October 25, 2006. On August 30, 2010, AMD announced that it would retire the ATI brand name for its graphics chipsets in favor of the AMD brand name.

In October 2008, AMD announced plans to spin off manufacturing operations in the form of GlobalFoundries Inc., a multibillion-dollar joint venture with Advanced Technology Investment Co., an investment company formed by the government of Abu Dhabi. The partnership and spin-off gave AMD an infusion of cash and allowed it to focus solely on chip design. To assure the Abu Dhabi investors of the new venture's success, AMD's CEO Hector Ruiz stepped down in July 2008, while remaining executive chairman, in preparation for becoming chairman of GlobalFoundries in March 2009. President and COO Dirk Meyer became AMD's CEO. Recessionary losses necessitated AMD cutting 1,100 jobs in 2009.

In August 2011, AMD announced that former Lenovo executive Rory Read would be joining the company as CEO, replacing Meyer. In November 2011, AMD announced plans to lay off more than 10% (1,400) of its employees from across all divisions worldwide. In October 2012, it announced plans to lay off an additional 15% of its workforce to reduce costs in the face of declining sales revenue. The inclusion of AMD chips into the PlayStation 4 and Xbox One were later seen as saving AMD from bankruptcy.

AMD acquired the low-power server manufacturer SeaMicro in early 2012, with an eye to bringing out an Arm64 server chip.

On October 8, 2014, AMD announced that Rory Read had stepped down after three years as president and chief executive officer. He was succeeded by Lisa Su, a key lieutenant who had been chief operating officer since June.

On October 16, 2014, AMD announced a new restructuring plan along with its Q3 results. Effective July 1, 2014, AMD reorganized into two business groups: Computing and Graphics, which primarily includes desktop and notebook processors and chipsets, discrete GPUs, and professional graphics; and Enterprise, Embedded, and Semi-Custom, which primarily includes server and embedded processors, dense servers, semi-custom SoC products (including solutions for gaming consoles), engineering services, and royalties. As part of this restructuring, AMD announced that 7% of its global workforce would be laid off by the end of 2014.

After the GlobalFoundries spin-off and subsequent layoffs, AMD was left with significant vacant space at 1 AMD Place, its aging Sunnyvale headquarters office complex. In August 2016, AMD's 47 years in Sunnyvale came to a close when it signed a lease with the Irvine Company for a new 220,000 sq. ft. headquarters building in Santa Clara. AMD's new location at Santa Clara Square faces the headquarters of arch-rival Intel across the Bayshore Freeway and San Tomas Aquino Creek. Around the same time, AMD also agreed to sell 1 AMD Place to the Irvine Company. In April 2019, the Irvine Company secured approval from the Sunnyvale City Council of its plans to demolish 1 AMD Place and redevelop the entire 32-acre site into townhomes and apartments.

=== 2020–present ===
In October 2020, AMD announced that it was acquiring Xilinx, the market leader in field-programmable gate arrays and complex programmable logic devices (FPGAs and CPLDs) in an all-stock transaction. The acquisition was completed in February 2022, with an estimated acquisition price of $50 billion.

In January 2024, AMD announced it was discontinuing the production of all complex programmable logic devices (CPLDs) acquired through Xilinx.

In March 2024, a rally in semiconductor stocks pushed AMD's valuation above $300B for the first time.

In July 2024, AMD announced that it would acquire the Finnish-based artificial intelligence start-up company Silo AI in a $665 million all-cash deal in an attempt to better compete with AI chip market leader Nvidia.

In August 2024, AMD signed a deal to acquire ZT Systems for $4.9 billion. The company creates custom computing infrastructure that is used for AI tasks.

Since early 2024, AMD has made significant gains in the server CPU market, reducing the gap with Intel. Initial reports of a 50:50 market split drew on incorrect data and were later revised. As of July 2025, Intel holds 63.3% of the server CPU market, while AMD has reached 36.5%, showing a strong upward trend for AMD despite Intel's continuing lead.

In June 2025, AMD unveiled the AI server for 2026, the MI400 series of chips, which will be the basis of a new server called "Helios".

In October 2025, the company announced it had agreed a deal with OpenAI to sell six gigawatts of its AI processors over the next five years. As part of the deal, OpenAI has the option to acquire a 10 per cent stake in AMD: 160 million shares at a token price of $0.01 per share contingent on meeting undisclosed performance targets, the final tranche of options requiring AMD common stock to reach $600 per share.

On September 28, 2026, AMD announced an agreement to acquire World Labs, an artificial intelligence startup specializing in 3D spatial intelligence and world models, in an all-stock transaction valued at approximately $8.2 billion. As part of the transaction, World Labs co-founder Dr. Fei-Fei Li agreed to join AMD as Executive Vice President and Chief Scientist, reporting directly to CEO Lisa Su. The acquistion was completed in November.

=== Acquisition history ===
Date	Company	Integration or division	Price
January 16, 1996	NexGen	AMD K6	$857 million in AMD shares
February 6, 2002	Alchemy Semiconductor	Processors (embedded CPUs)	Undisclosed
August 6, 2003	Coatue	Memory (non-volatile polymer-based memory)	Undisclosed
July 24, 2006	ATI Technologies	Graphics and 3D software (Radeon GPUs)	$5,400 million
February 29, 2012	SeaMicro	Data center platform	$334 million
June 29, 2016	HiAlgo	Gaming experience (Radeon Chill, Radeon Boost and Radeon Swift)	Undisclosed
April 10, 2017	Nitero	60 GHz wireless IP (headset AR and VR)	Undisclosed
October 27, 2020	Xilinx	Custom chips (FPGA, adaptive SoCs, system on modules, IA accelerator)	$49,000 million
April 4, 2022	Pensando	Data center, cloud solutions and DPUs	$1,900 million
August 29, 2023	Mipsology	AI inference software	Undisclosed
October 10, 2023	Nod.ai	Open-source AI software, talent acquisition	Undisclosed
July 10, 2024	Silo AI	AI software	$665 million
August 19, 2024	ZT Systems	Data center hardware	$4,900 million
May 28, 2025	Enosemi	Photonic IC	Undisclosed
June 4, 2025	Brium	Compiler and AI software	Undisclosed
June 5, 2025	Untether AI	AI inference hardware	(acqui-hire)
June 12, 2025	Lamini	AI software	(hire entire team)
November 10, 2025	MK1	AI software	Undisclosed
August 6, 2026 (announced)	Taalas	AI inference hardware	Undisclosed
November 16, 2026	World Labs	AI models, spatial intelligence, and robotics simulation	$8,200 million

== Products ==
=== CPUs and APUs ===
AMD microprocessors
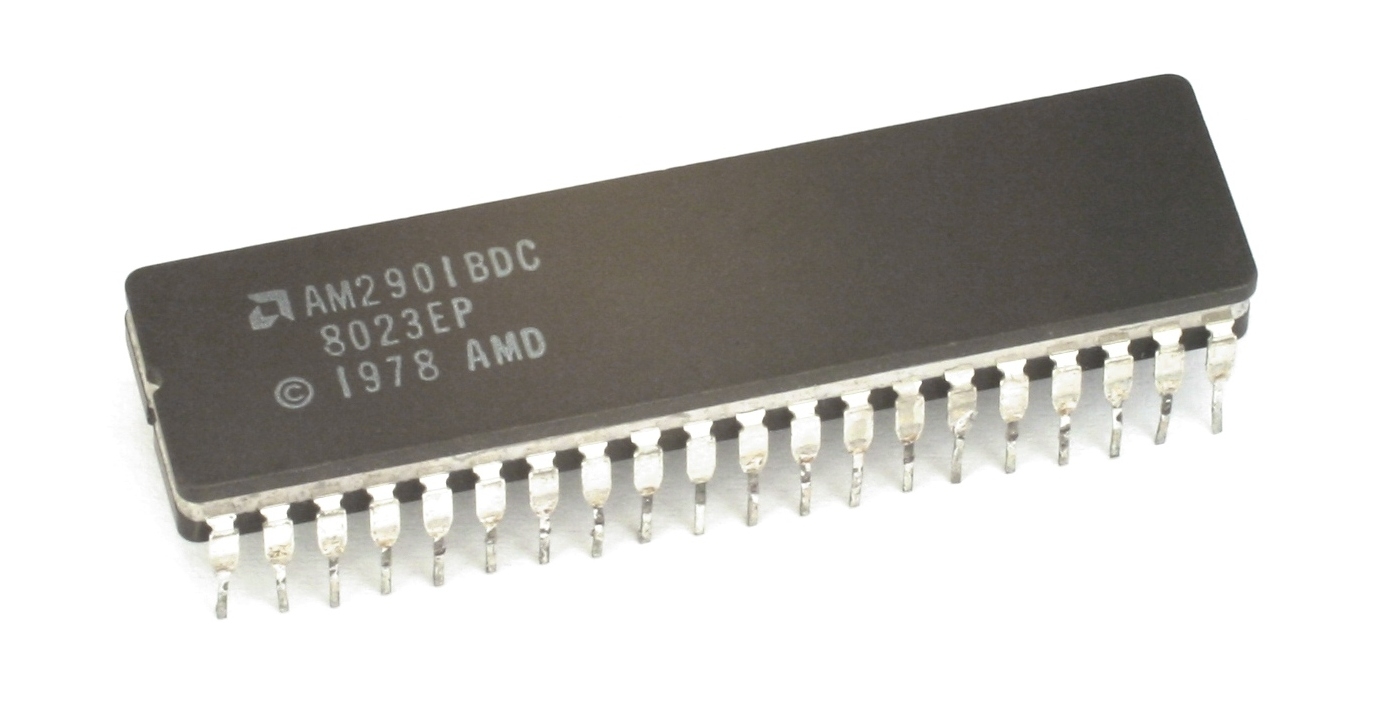
Am2900 series (1975)

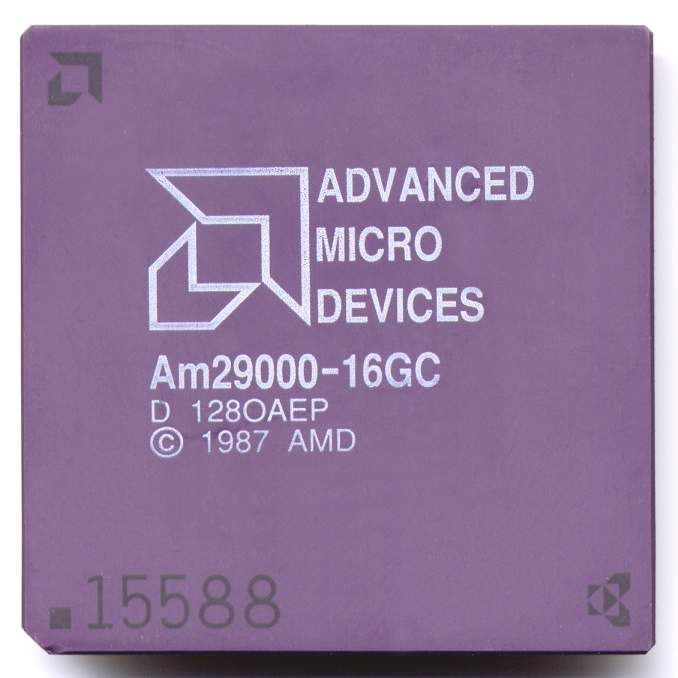
AMD 29000 series (1987–1995)

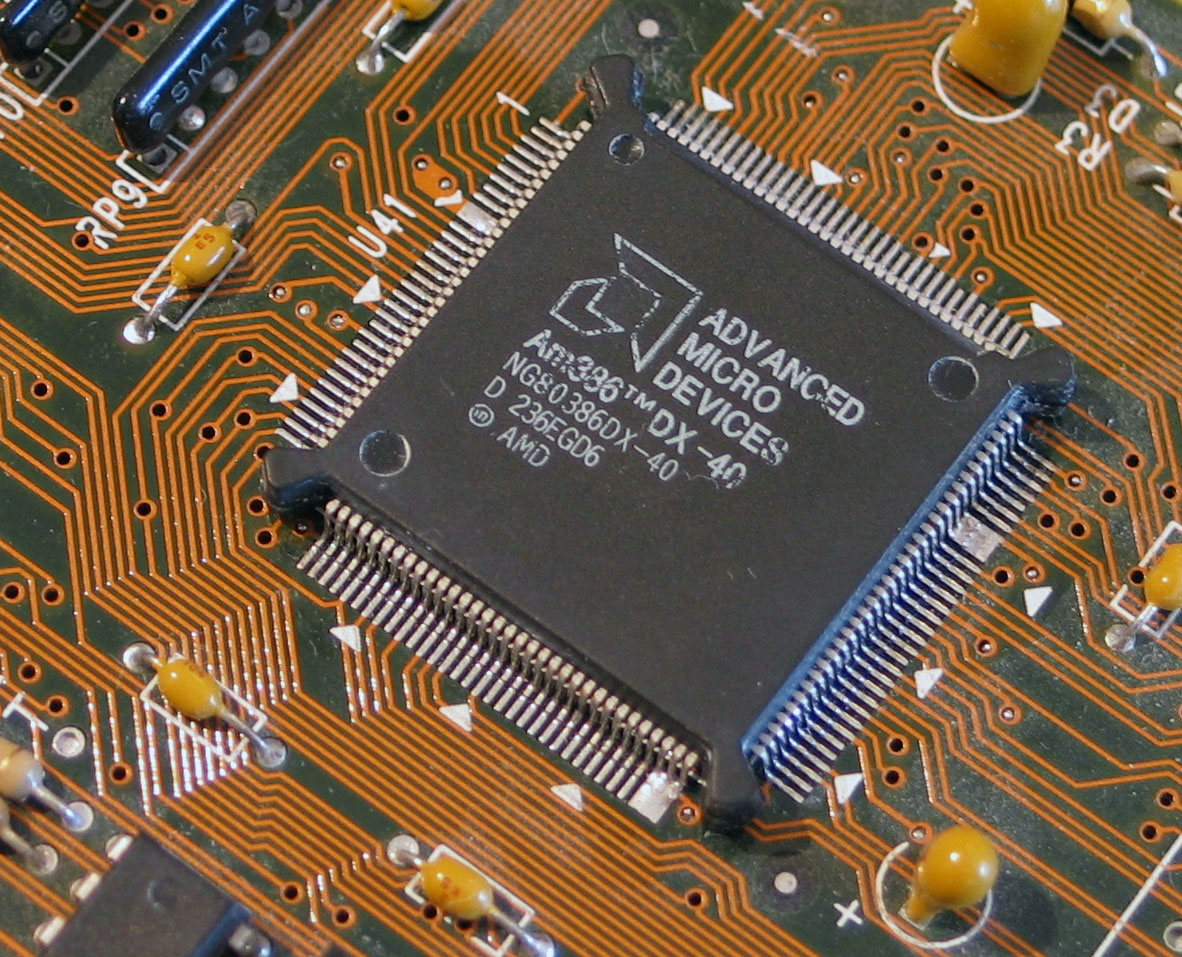
Am386 Amx86 series (1991–1995)

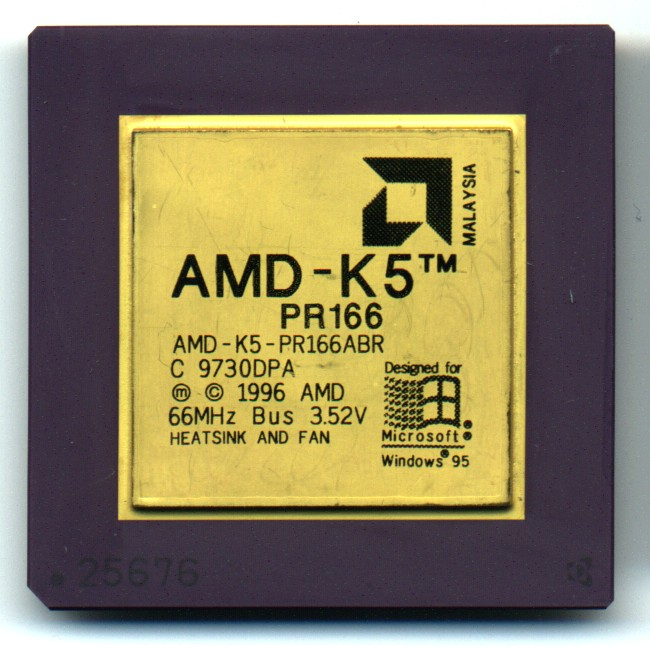
K5 architecture (1996)

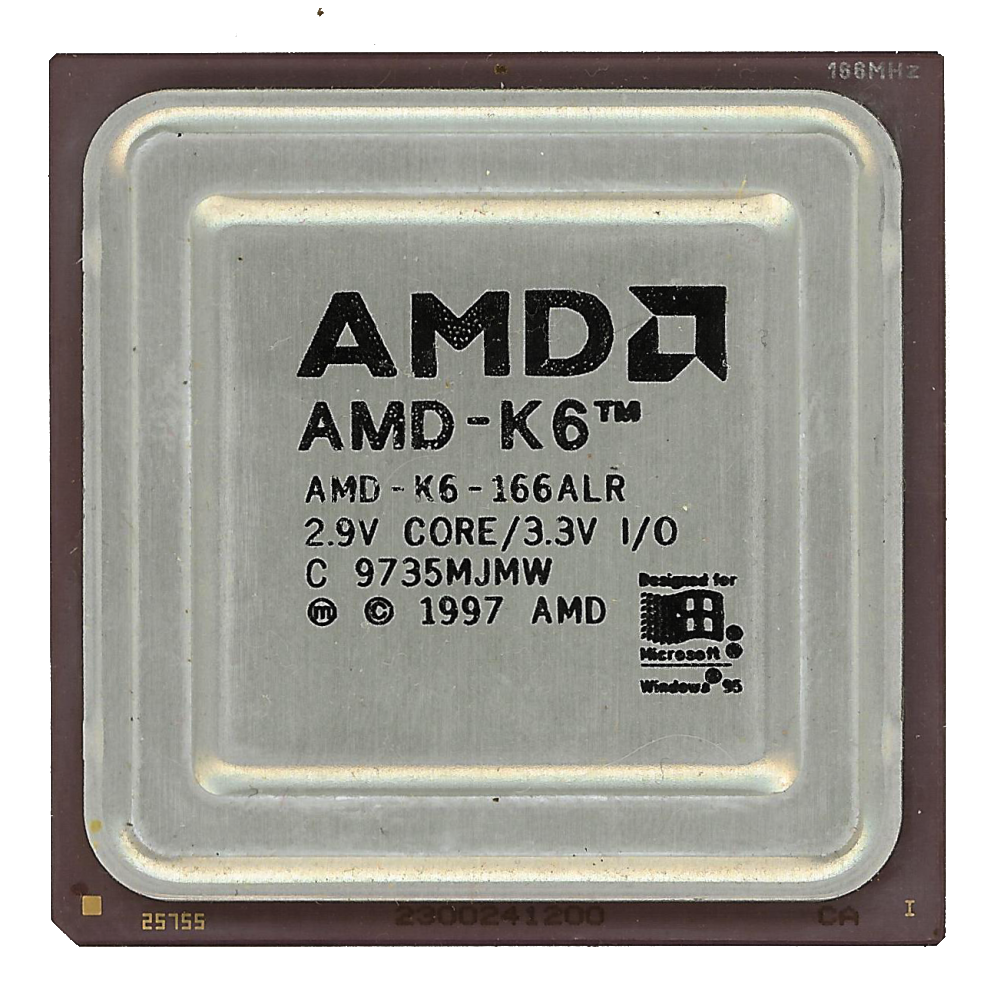
K6 architecture (1997–2001)

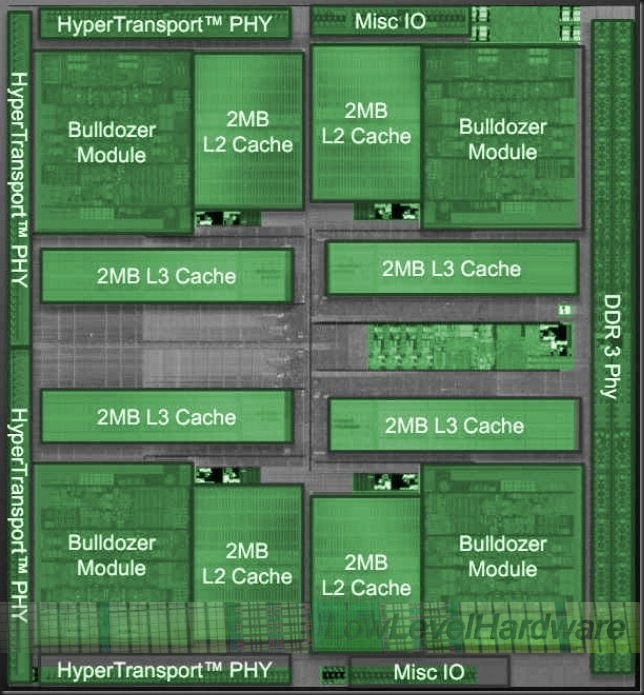
Bulldozer Series CPUs Bulldozer, Piledriver, Steamroller, Excavator (2011–2017)

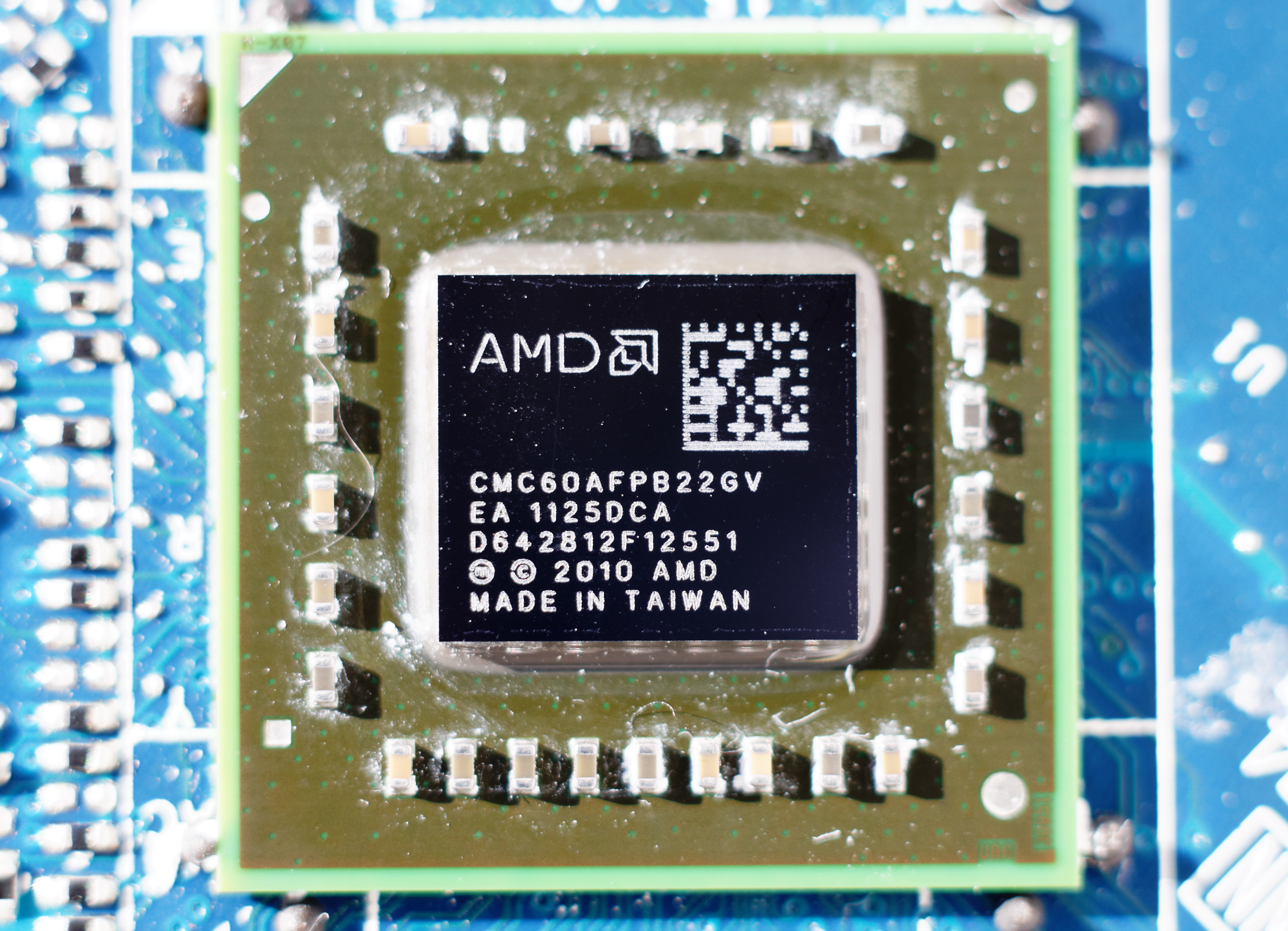
Bobcat series APUs Bobcat, Jaguar, Puma (2011–present)

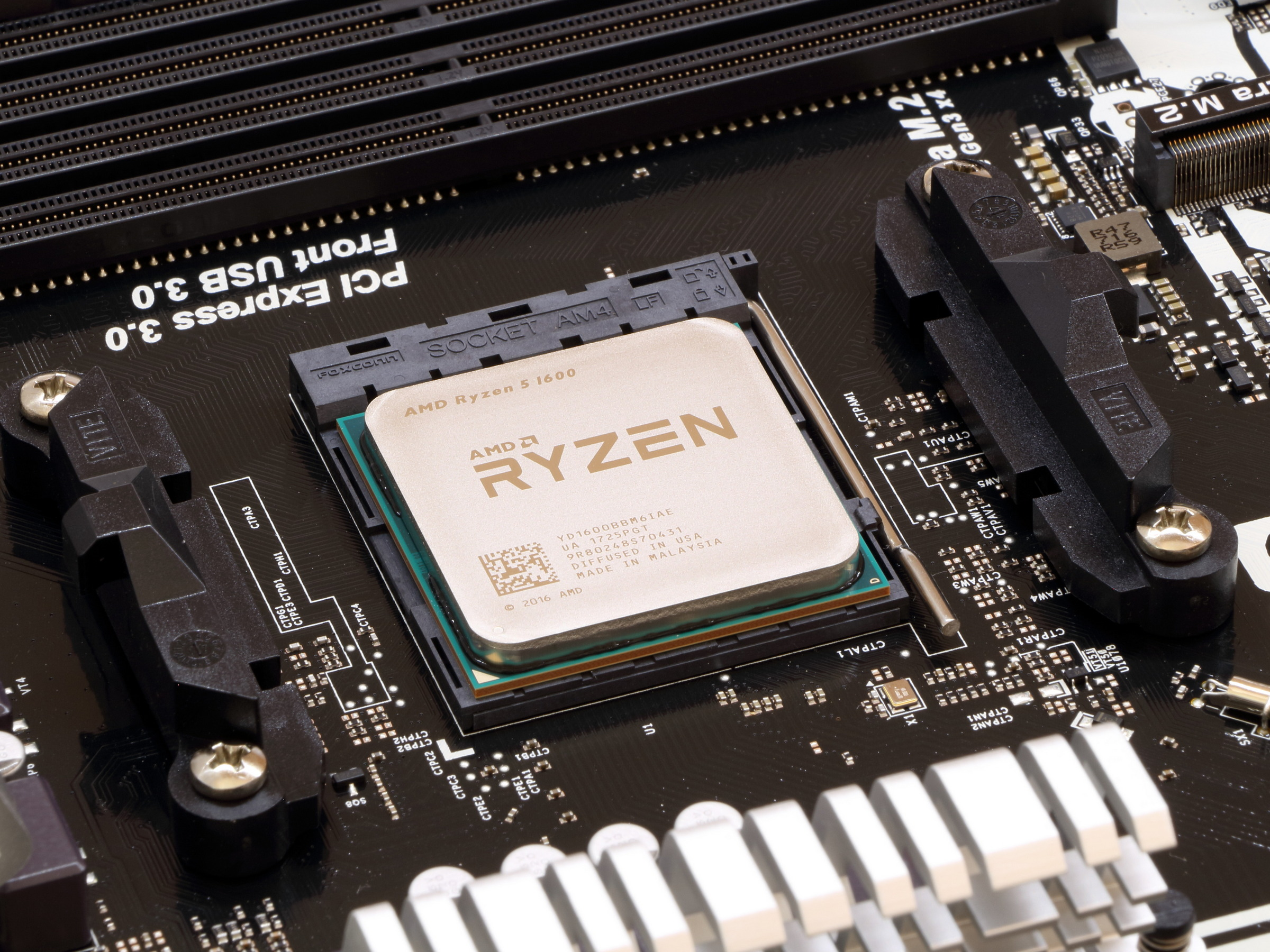
Zen core architecture (2017)

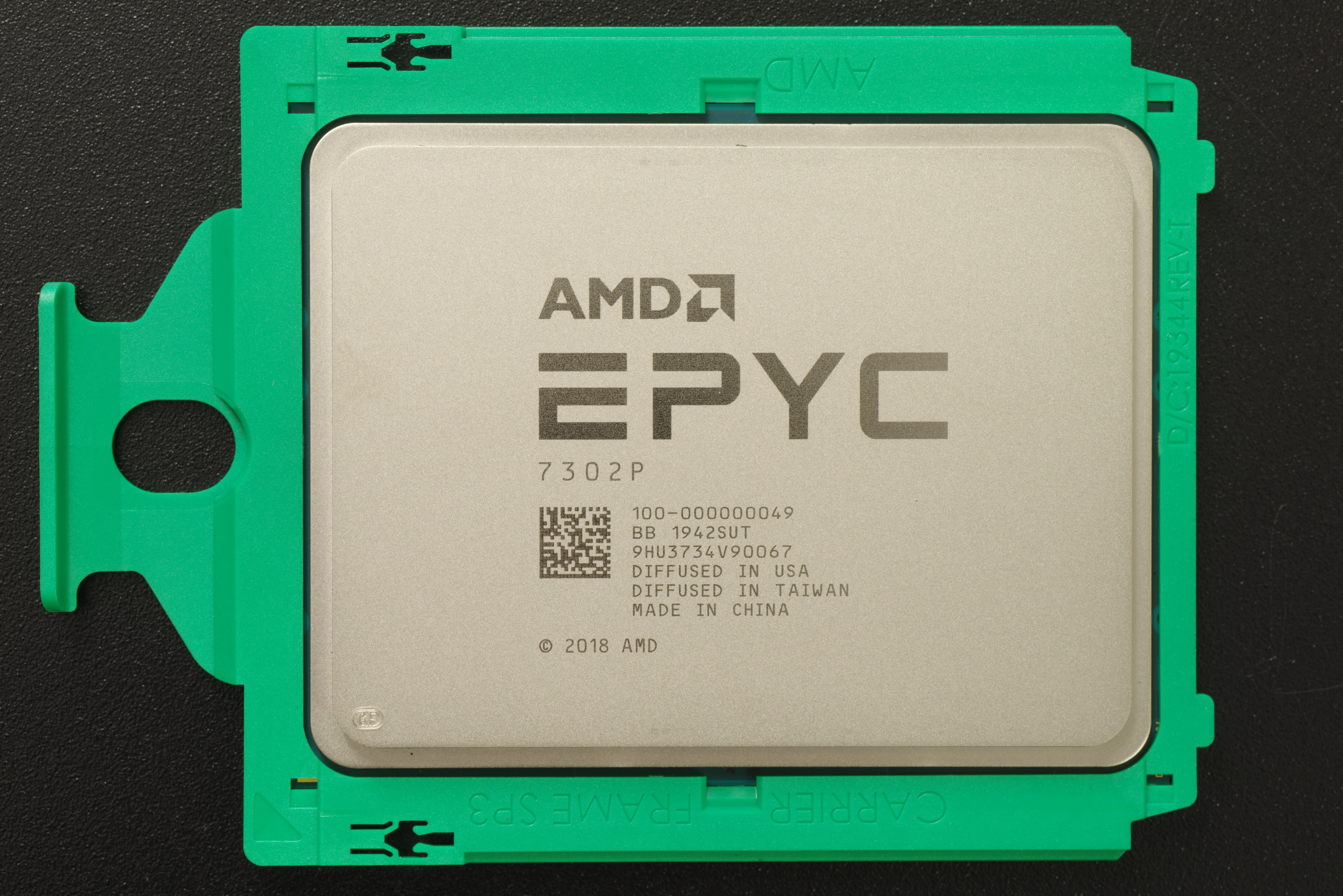
Zen 2 series (released 2019)

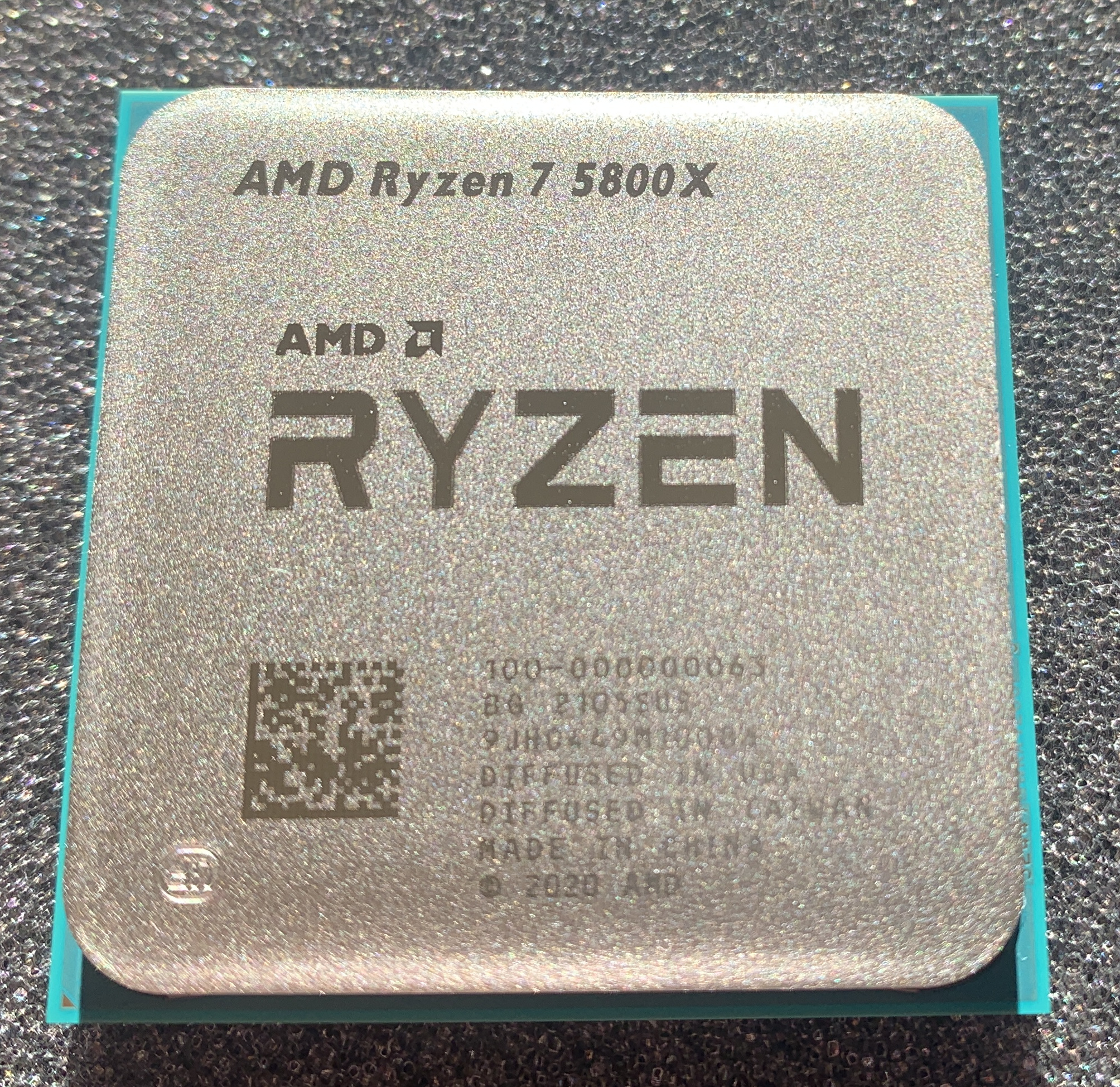
Zen 3 series (released 2020)

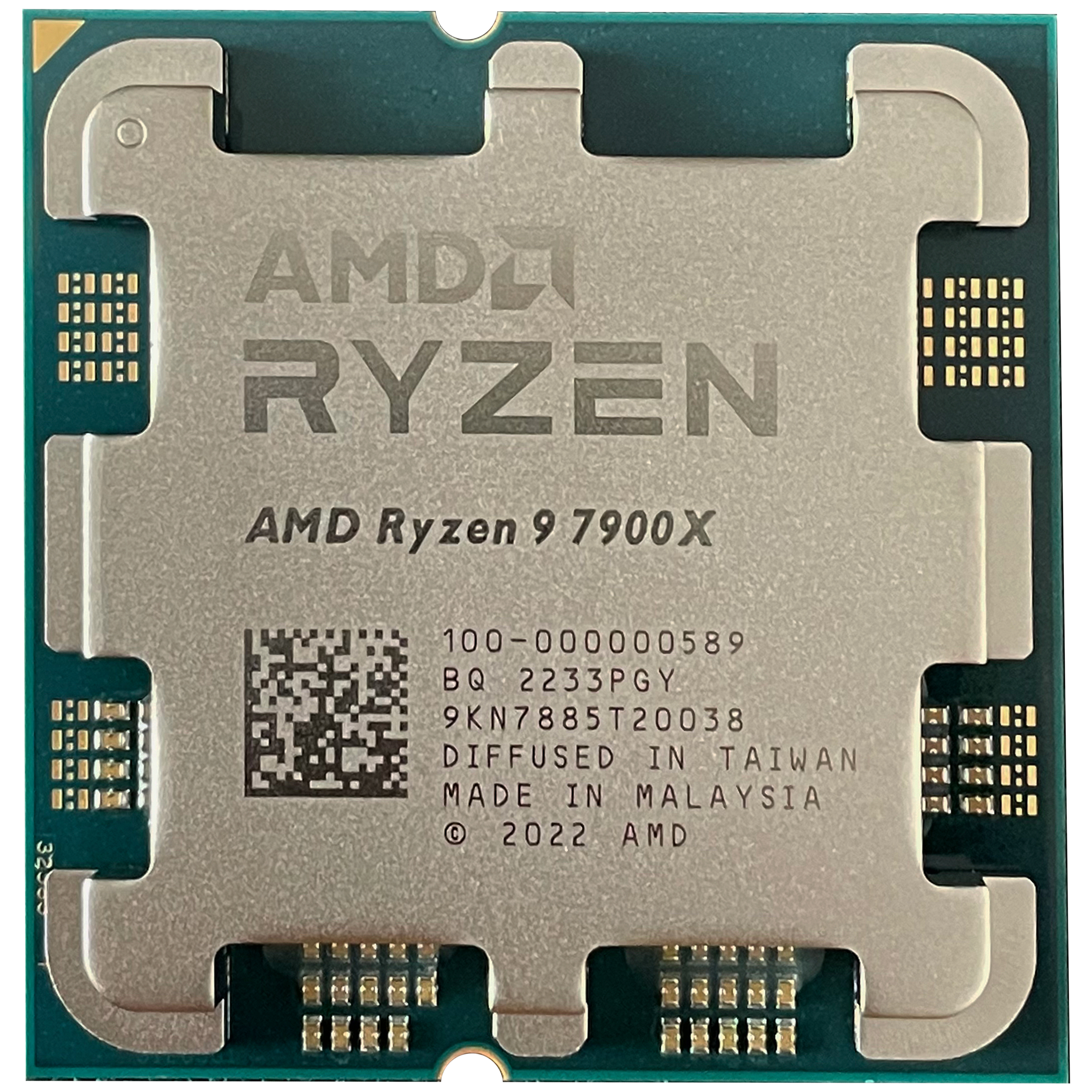
Zen 4 series (released 2022)

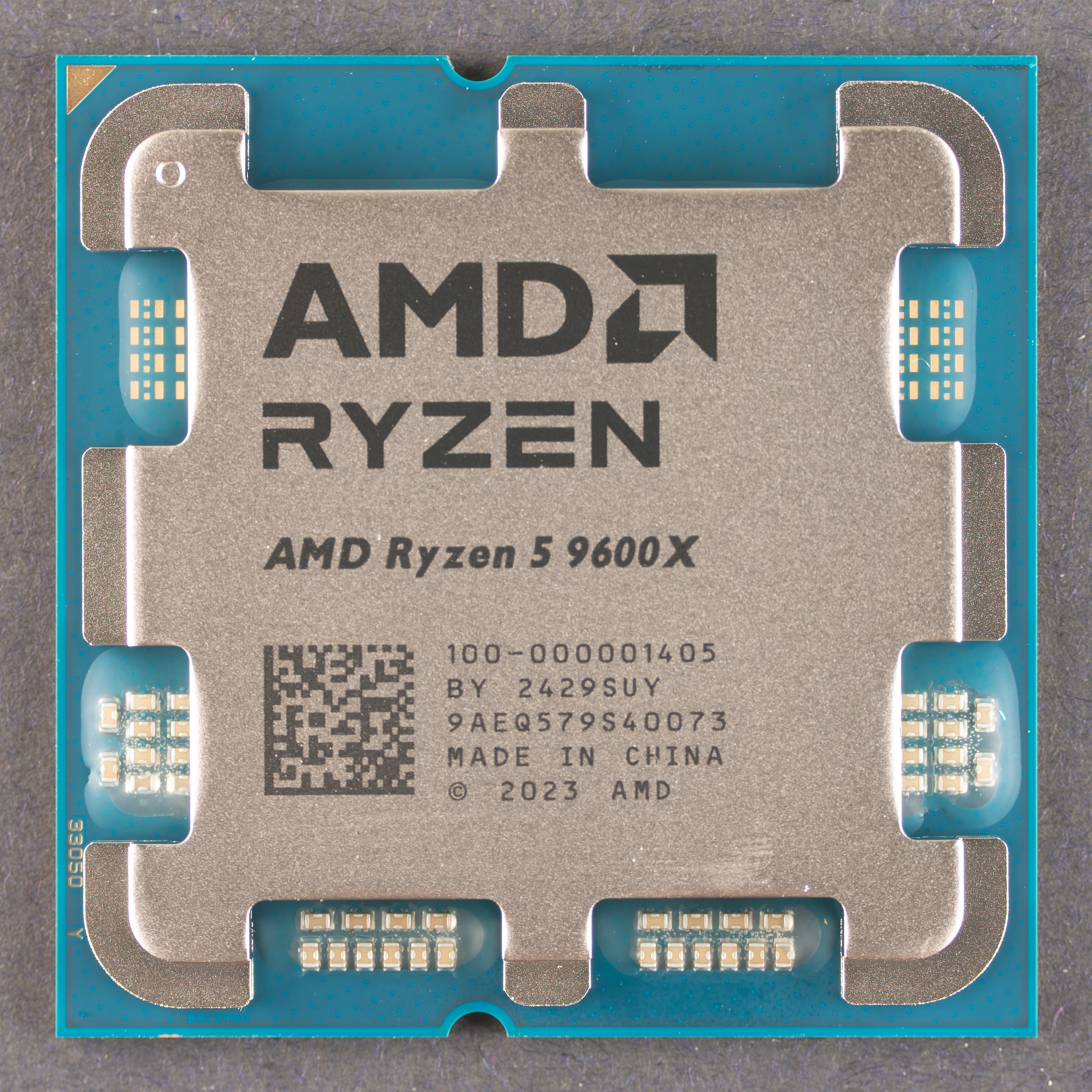
Zen 5 series (released 2024)

==== IBM PC and the x86 architecture ====
In February 1982, AMD signed a contract with Intel, becoming a licensed second-source manufacturer of 8086 and 8088 processors. IBM wanted to use the Intel 8088 in its IBM PC, but its policy at the time was to require at least two sources for its chips (→ Second source). AMD later produced the Am286 under the same arrangement. In 1984, Intel internally decided to no longer cooperate with AMD in supplying product information to shore up its advantage in the marketplace, and delayed and eventually refused to convey the technical details of the Intel 80386. In 1987, AMD invoked arbitration over the issue, and Intel reacted by canceling the 1982 technological-exchange agreement altogether. After three years of testimony, AMD eventually won in arbitration in 1992, but Intel disputed this decision. Another long legal dispute followed, ending in 1994 when the Supreme Court of California sided with the arbitrator and AMD.

In 1990, Intel countersued AMD, renegotiating AMD's right to use derivatives of Intel's microcode for its cloned processors. In the face of uncertainty during the legal dispute, AMD was forced to develop clean room designed versions of Intel code for its x386 and x486 processors, the former long after Intel had released its own x386 in 1985. In March 1991, AMD released the Am386, its clone of the Intel 386 processor. By October of the same year it had sold one million units.

In 1993, AMD introduced the first of the Am486 family of processors, which proved popular with a large number of original equipment manufacturers, including Compaq, which signed an exclusive agreement using the Am486. The Am5x86, another Am486-based processor, was released in November 1995, and continued AMD's success as a fast, cost-effective processor.

Finally, in an agreement effective 1996, AMD received the rights to the microcode in Intel's x386 and x486 processor families, but not the rights to the microcode in the following generations of processors.

==== K5, K6, Athlon, Duron, and Sempron ====
AMD's first in-house x86 processor was the K5, launched in 1996. The "K" in its name was a reference to Kryptonite, the only substance known to harm comic book character Superman. This itself was a reference to Intel's hegemony over the market, i.e., an anthropomorphization of them as Superman. The number "5" was a reference to the fifth generation of x86 processors; rival Intel had previously introduced its line of fifth-generation x86 processors as Pentium because the U.S. Trademark and Patent Office had ruled that mere numbers could not be trademarked.

In 1996, AMD purchased NexGen, specifically for the rights to its Nx series of x86-compatible processors. AMD gave the NexGen design team their own building, left them alone, and gave them time and money to rework the Nx686. The result was the K6 processor, introduced in 1997. Although it was based on Socket 7, variants such as K6-III/450 were faster than Intel's Pentium II (sixth-generation processor).

The K7 was AMD's seventh-generation x86 processor, making its debut under the brand name Athlon on June 23, 1999. Unlike previous AMD processors, it could not be used on the same motherboards as Intel's, due to licensing issues surrounding Intel's Slot 1 connector, and instead used a Slot A connector, referenced to the Alpha processor bus. The Duron was a lower-cost and limited version of the Athlon (64 KB instead of 256 KB L2 cache) in a 462-pin socketed PGA (socket A) or soldered directly onto the motherboard. Sempron was released as a lower-cost Athlon XP, replacing Duron in the socket A PGA era. It has since been migrated upward to all new sockets, up to AM3.

On October 9, 2001, the Athlon XP was released. On February 10, 2003, the Athlon XP with 512 KB L2 Cache was released.

==== Athlon 64, Opteron, and Phenom ====
The K8 was a major revision of the K7 architecture, with the most notable features being the addition of a 64-bit extension to the x86 instruction set (called x86-64, AMD64, or x64), the incorporation of an on-chip memory controller, and the implementation of an extremely high-performance point-to-point interconnect called HyperTransport, as part of the Direct Connect Architecture. The technology was initially launched as the Opteron server-oriented processor on April 22, 2003. Shortly thereafter, it was incorporated into a product for desktop PCs, branded Athlon 64.

On April 21, 2005, AMD released the first dual-core Opteron, an x86-based server CPU. A month later, it released the Athlon 64 X2, the first desktop-based dual-core processor family. In May 2007, AMD abandoned the string "64" in its dual-core desktop product branding, becoming Athlon X2, downplaying the significance of 64-bit computing in its processors. Further updates involved improvements to the microarchitecture, and a shift of the target market from mainstream desktop systems to value dual-core desktop systems. In 2008, AMD started to release dual-core Sempron processors exclusively in China, branded as the Sempron 2000 series, with lower HyperTransport speed and smaller L2 cache. AMD completed its dual-core product portfolio for each market segment.

In September 2007, AMD released the first server Opteron K10 processors, followed in November by the Phenom processor for desktop. K10 processors came in dual-core, triple-core, and quad-core versions, with all cores on a single die. AMD released a new platform codenamed "Spider", which used the new Phenom processor, and an R770 GPU and a 790 GX/FX chipset from the AMD 700 chipset series. However, AMD built the Spider at 65nm, which was uncompetitive with Intel's smaller and more power-efficient 45nm.

In January 2009, AMD released a new processor line dubbed Phenom II, a refresh of the original Phenom built using the 45 nm process. AMD's new platform, codenamed "Dragon", used the new Phenom II processor, and an ATI R770 GPU from the R700 GPU family, and a 790 GX/FX chipset from the AMD 700 chipset series. The Phenom II came in dual-core, triple-core and quad-core variants, all using the same die, with cores disabled for the triple-core and dual-core versions. The Phenom II resolved issues that the original Phenom had, including a low clock speed, a small L3 cache, and a Cool'n'Quiet bug that decreased performance. The Phenom II cost less but was not performance-competitive with Intel's mid-to-high-range Core 2 Quads. The Phenom II also enhanced its predecessor's memory controller, allowing it to use DDR3 in a new native socket AM3, while maintaining backward compatibility with AM2+, the socket used for the Phenom, and allowing the use of the DDR2 memory that was used with the platform.

In April 2010, AMD released a new Phenom II Hexa-core (6-core) processor codenamed "Thuban". This was a totally new die based on the hexa-core "Istanbul" Opteron processor. It included AMD's "turbo core" technology, which allows the processor to automatically switch from 6 cores to 3 faster cores when more pure speed is needed.

The Magny Cours and Lisbon server parts were released in 2010. The Magny Cours part came in 8 to 12 cores and the Lisbon part in 4 and 6 core parts. Magny Cours is focused on performance while the Lisbon part is focused on high performance per watt. Magny Cours is an MCM (multi-chip module) with two hexa-core "Istanbul" Opteron parts. This will use a new socket G34 for dual and quad-socket processors and thus will be marketed as Opteron 61xx series processors. Lisbon uses socket C32 certified for dual-socket use or single socket use only and thus will be marketed as Opteron 41xx processors. Both will be built on a 45 nm SOI process.

==== Fusion becomes the AMD APU ====
Following AMD's 2006 acquisition of Canadian graphics company ATI Technologies, an initiative codenamed Fusion was announced to integrate a CPU and GPU together on some of AMD's microprocessors, including a built in PCI Express link to accommodate separate PCI Express peripherals, eliminating the northbridge chip from the motherboard. The initiative intended to move some of the processing originally done on the CPU (e.g. floating-point unit operations) to the GPU, which is better optimized for some calculations. The Fusion was later renamed the AMD APU (Accelerated Processing Unit).

Llano was AMD's first APU built for laptops. Llano was the second APU released, targeted at the mainstream market. It incorporated a CPU and GPU on the same die, and northbridge functions, and used "Socket FM1" with DDR3 memory. The CPU part of the processor was based on the Phenom II "Deneb" processor. AMD suffered an unexpected decrease in revenue based on production problems for the Llano. More AMD APUs for laptops running Windows 7 and Windows 8 OS are being used commonly. These include AMD's price-point APUs, the E1 and E2, and their mainstream competitors with Intel's Core i-series: The Vision A- series, the A standing for accelerated. These range from the lower-performance A4 chipset to the A6, A8, and A10. These all incorporate next-generation Radeon graphics cards, with the A4 utilizing the base Radeon HD chip and the rest using a Radeon R4 graphics card, with the exception of the highest-model A10 (A10-7300) which uses an R6 graphics card.

==== New microarchitectures ====
===== High-power, high-performance Bulldozer cores =====
Bulldozer was AMD's microarchitecture codename for server and desktop AMD FX processors, first released on October 12, 2011. This family 15h microarchitecture is the successor to the family 10h (K10) microarchitecture design. Bulldozer was a clean-sheet design, not a development of earlier processors. The core was specifically aimed at 10–125 W TDP computing products. AMD claimed dramatic performance-per-watt efficiency improvements in high-performance computing (HPC) applications with Bulldozer cores. While hopes were high that Bulldozer would bring AMD to be performance-competitive with Intel once more, most benchmarks were disappointing. In some cases the new Bulldozer products were slower than the K10 models they were built to replace.

The Piledriver microarchitecture was the 2012 successor to Bulldozer, increasing clock speeds and performance relative to its predecessor. Piledriver would be released in AMD FX, APU, and Opteron product lines. Piledriver was subsequently followed by the Steamroller microarchitecture in 2013. Used exclusively in AMD's APUs, Steamroller focused on greater parallelism.

In 2015, the Excavator microarchitecture replaced Piledriver. Expected to be the last microarchitecture of the Bulldozer series, Excavator focused on improved power efficiency.

===== Low-power Cat cores =====
The Bobcat microarchitecture was revealed during a speech from Henri Richard, AMD executive vice-president, in Computex 2007, and was put into production during the first quarter of 2011. Based on the difficulty competing in the x86 market with a single core optimized for the 10–100 W range, AMD had developed a simpler core with a target range of 1–10 watts. In addition, it was believed that the core could migrate into the hand-held space if the power consumption can be reduced to less than 1 W.

Jaguar is a microarchitecture codename for Bobcat's successor, released in 2013, that is used in various APUs from AMD aimed at the low-power/low-cost market. Jaguar and its derivates would go on to be used in the custom APUs of the PlayStation 4, Xbox One, PlayStation 4 Pro, Xbox One S, and Xbox One X. Jaguar would be later followed by the Puma microarchitecture in 2014.

===== ARM architecture-based designs =====
In 2012, AMD announced it was working on ARM products, both as a semi-custom product and server product. The initial server product was announced as the Opteron A1100 in 2014, an 8-core Cortex-A57-based ARMv8-A SoC, and was expected to be followed by an APU incorporating a Graphics Core Next GPU. However, the Opteron A1100 was not released until 2016, with the delay attributed to adding software support. The A1100 was also criticized for not having support from major vendors upon its release.

In 2014, AMD also announced the K12 custom core for release in 2016. While being ARMv8-A instruction set architecture compliant, the K12 was expected to be entirely custom-designed, targeting the server, embedded, and semi-custom markets. While ARM architecture development continued, products based on K12 were subsequently delayed with no release planned. Development of AMD's x86-based Zen microarchitecture was preferred.

==== Zen-based CPUs and APUs ====
Zen is an architecture for x86-64 based Ryzen series of CPUs and APUs, introduced in 2017 by AMD and built from the ground up by a team led by Jim Keller, beginning with his arrival in 2012, and taping out before his departure in September 2015.

One of AMD's primary goals with Zen was an IPC increase of at least 40%, however in February 2017 AMD announced that it had actually achieved a 52% increase. Processors made on the Zen architecture are built on the 14 nm FinFET node and have a renewed focus on single-core performance and HSA compatibility. Previous processors from AMD were either built in the 32 nm process ("Bulldozer" and "Piledriver" CPUs) or the 28 nm process ("Steamroller" and "Excavator" APUs). Because of this, Zen is much more energy efficient.

The Zen architecture is the first to encompass CPUs and APUs from AMD built for a single socket (Socket AM4). Also new for this architecture is the implementation of simultaneous multithreading (SMT) technology, something Intel has had for years on some of its processors with its proprietary hyper-threading implementation of SMT. This is a departure from the "Clustered MultiThreading" design introduced with the Bulldozer architecture. Zen also has support for DDR4 memory.

AMD released the Zen-based high-end Ryzen 7 "Summit Ridge" series CPUs on March 2, 2017, mid-range Ryzen 5 series CPUs on April 11, 2017, and entry level Ryzen 3 series CPUs on July 27, 2017. AMD later released the Epyc line of Zen derived server processors for 1P and 2P systems. In October 2017, AMD released Zen-based APUs as Ryzen Mobile, incorporating Vega graphics cores. In January 2018, AMD announced its new lineup plans, with Ryzen 2. AMD launched CPUs with the 12nm Zen+ microarchitecture in April 2018, following up with the 7nm Zen 2 microarchitecture in June 2019, including an update to the Epyc line with new processors using the Zen 2 microarchitecture in August 2019, and Zen 3 slated for release in Q3 2020.

As of 2019, AMD's Ryzen processors were reported to outsell Intel's consumer desktop processors. At CES 2020 AMD announced its Ryzen Mobile 4000, as the first 7 nm x86 mobile processor, the first 7 nm 8-core (also 16-thread) high-performance mobile processor, and the first 8-core (also 16-thread) processor for ultrathin laptops. This generation is still based on the Zen 2 architecture. In October 2020, AMD announced new processors based on the Zen 3 architecture. On PassMark's Single thread performance test the Ryzen 5 5600x bested all other CPUs besides the Ryzen 9 5950X.

In April 2020, AMD launched three new SKUs which target commercial HPC workloads & hyperconverged infrastructure applications. The launch was based on Epyc's 7 nm second-generation Rome platform and supported by Dell EMC, Hewlett Packard Enterprise, Lenovo, Supermicro, and Nutanix. IBM Cloud was its first public cloud partner. In August 2022, AMD announced its initial lineup of CPUs based on the new Zen 4 architecture.

The Steam Deck, PlayStation 5, Xbox Series X and Series S all use chips based on the Zen 2 microarchitecture, with proprietary tweaks and different configurations in each system's implementation than AMD sells in its own commercially available APUs.

=== Graphics products and GPUs ===
AMD graphics processing units
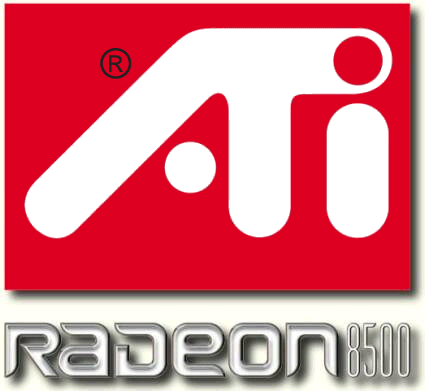
Radeon R200 series (2001)

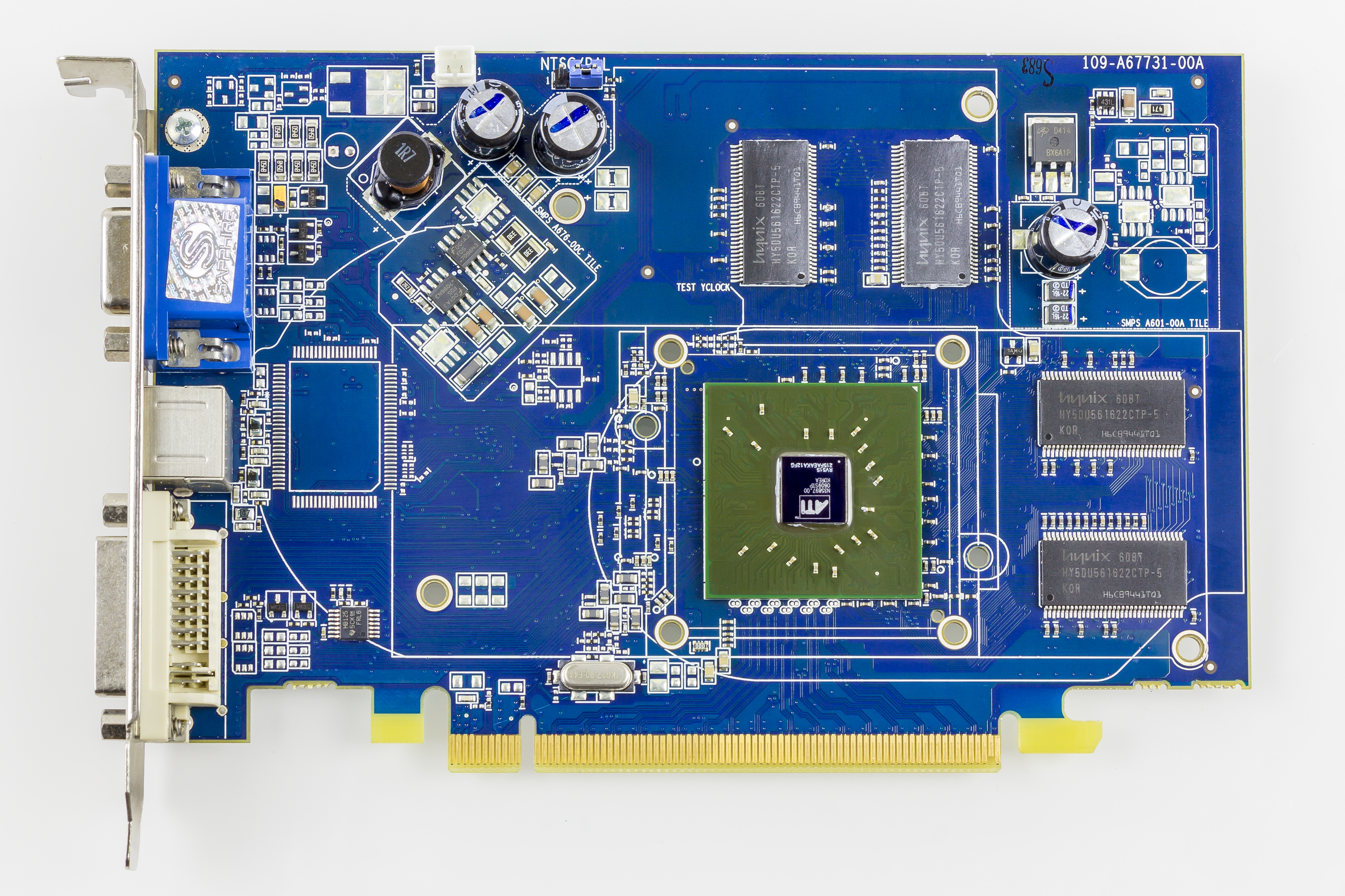
Radeon R500 (2005)

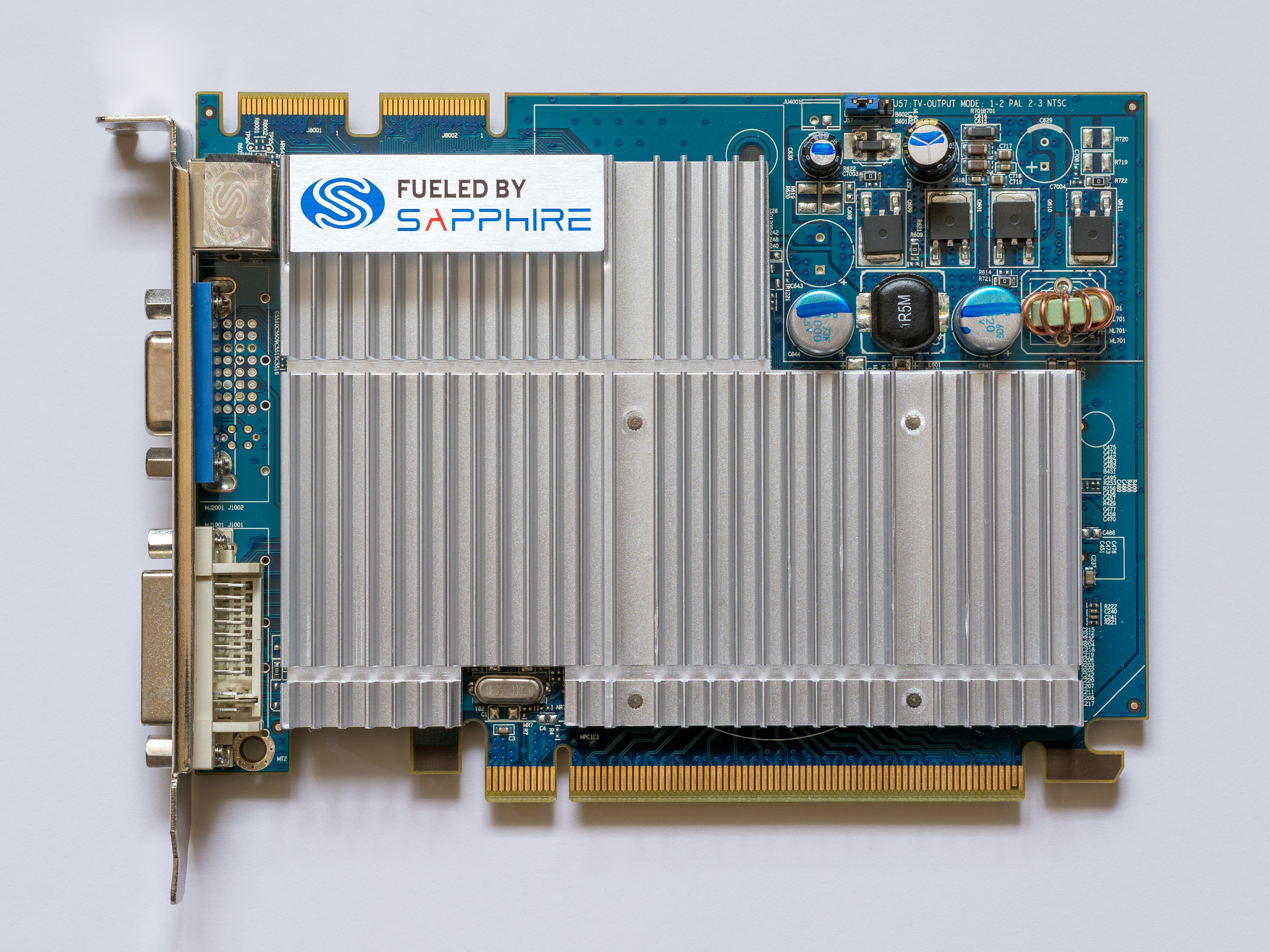
Radeon HD 2000 series (2007a)

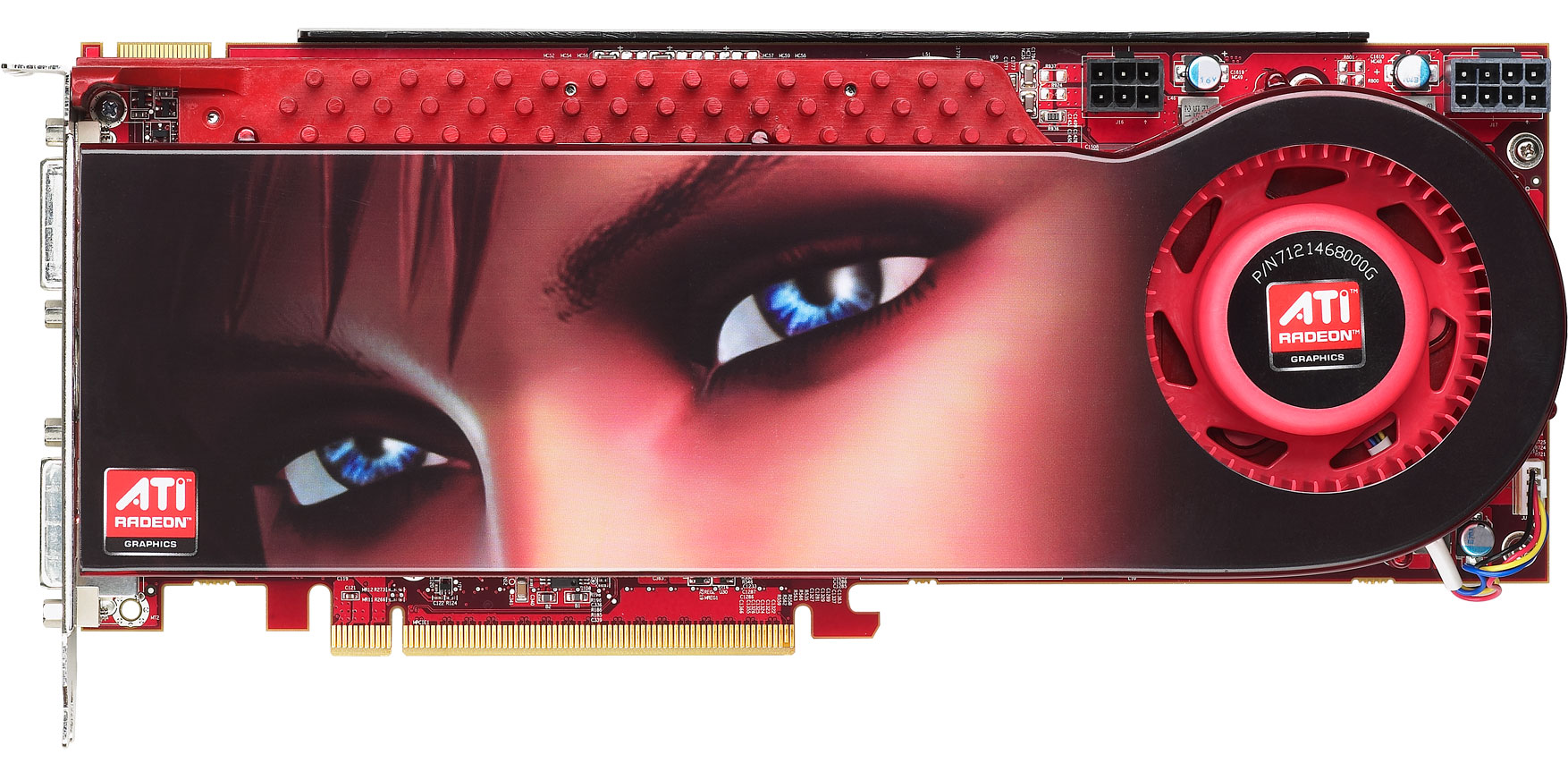
Radeon HD 3000 series (2007b)

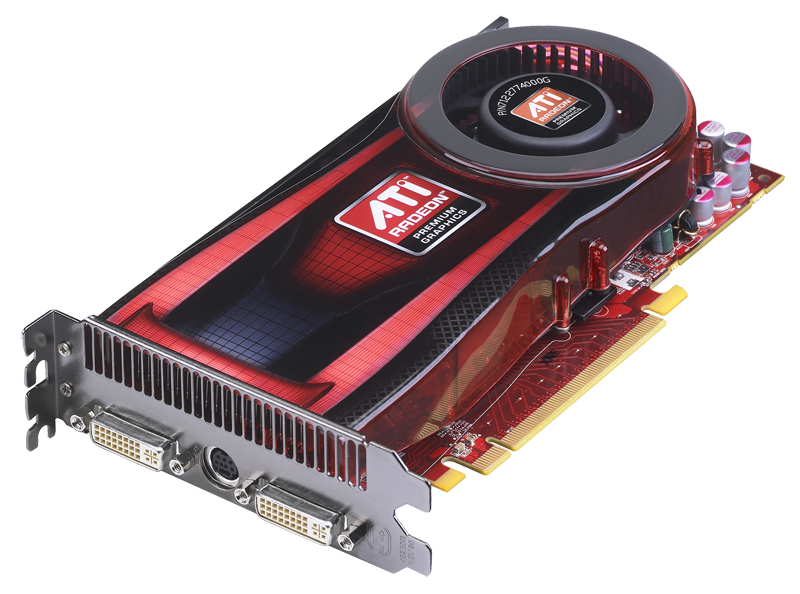
Radeon HD 4000 series (2008)

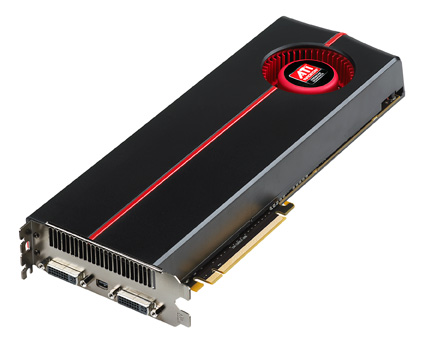
Radeon HD 5000 series (2009)

Radeon HD 6000 series (2010)

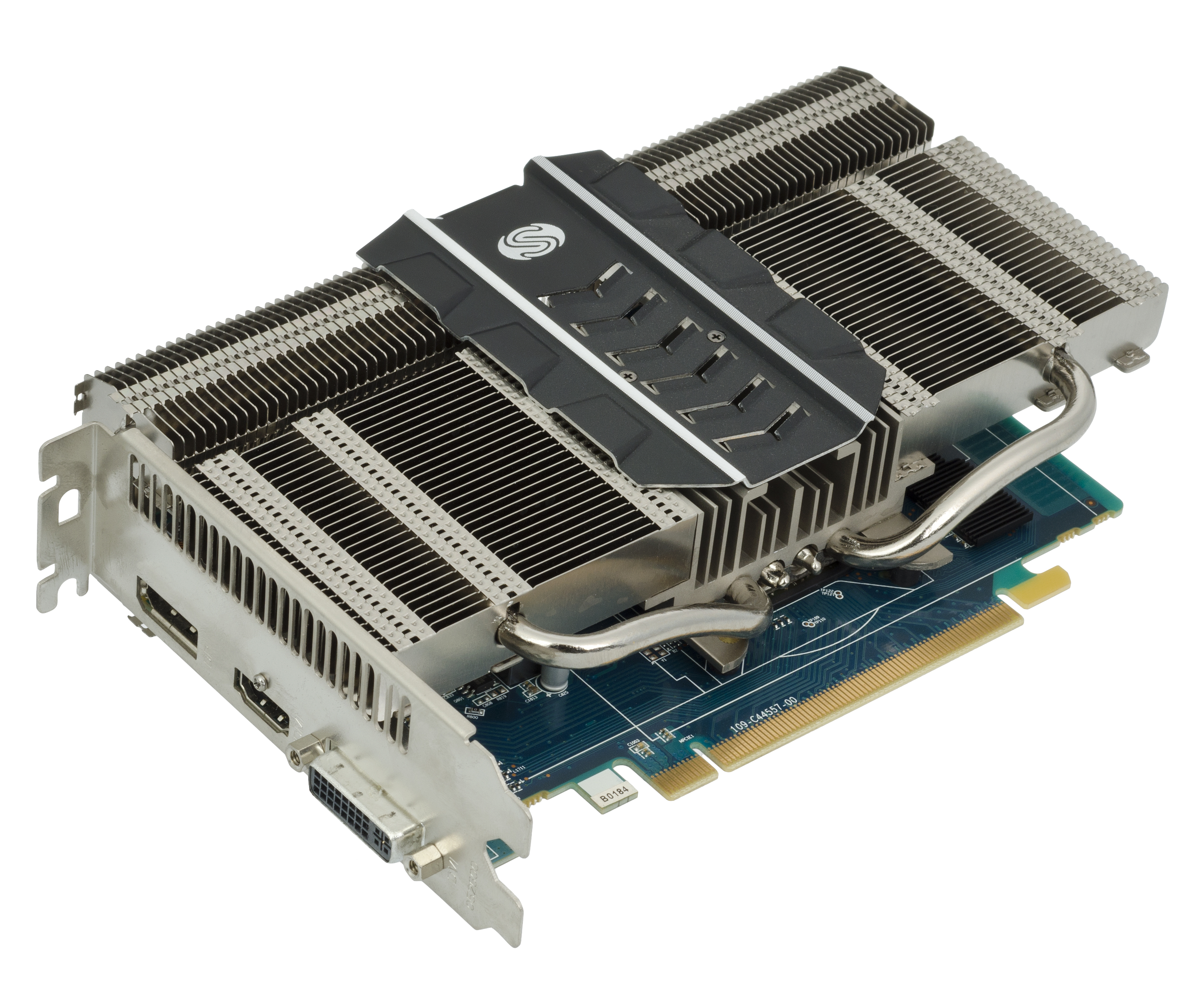
Radeon HD 7000 series (2012)

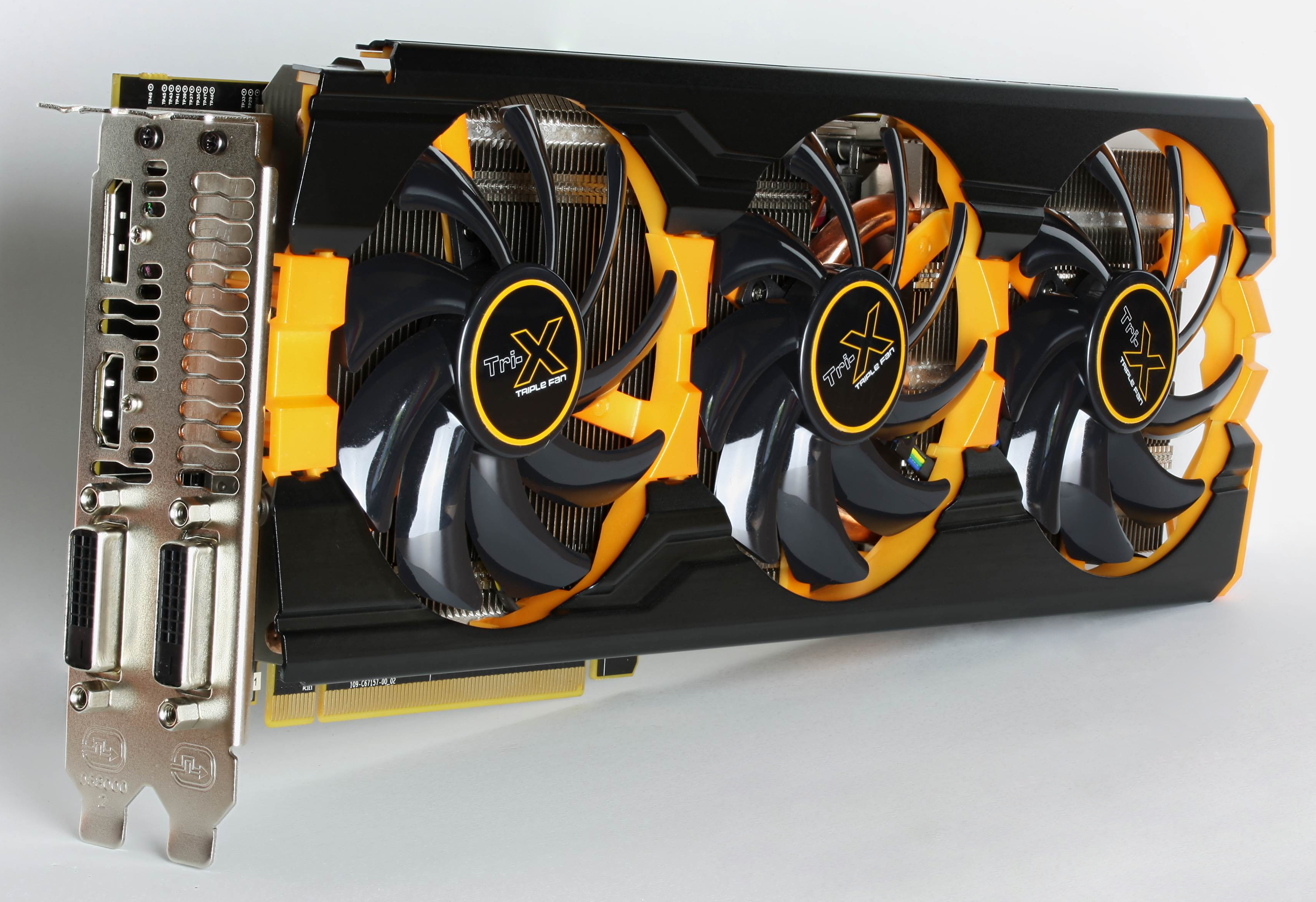
Radeon Rx 200 series (2013)

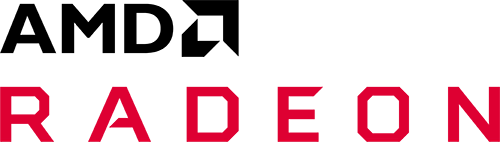
Radeon RX 400 series (2016)

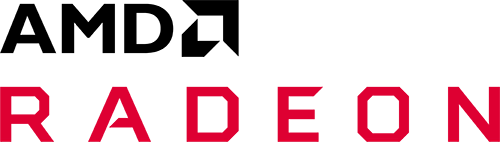
Radeon RX 500 series (2016)

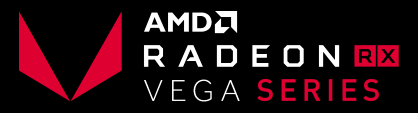
Radeon RX Vega series (2017)

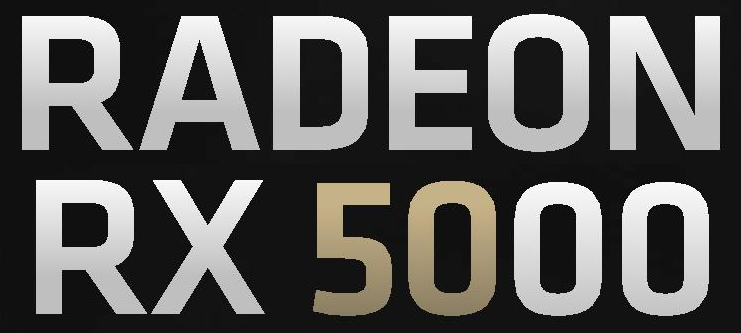
Radeon RX 5000 series (2019)

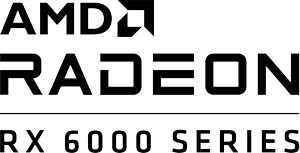
Radeon RX 6000 series (2020)

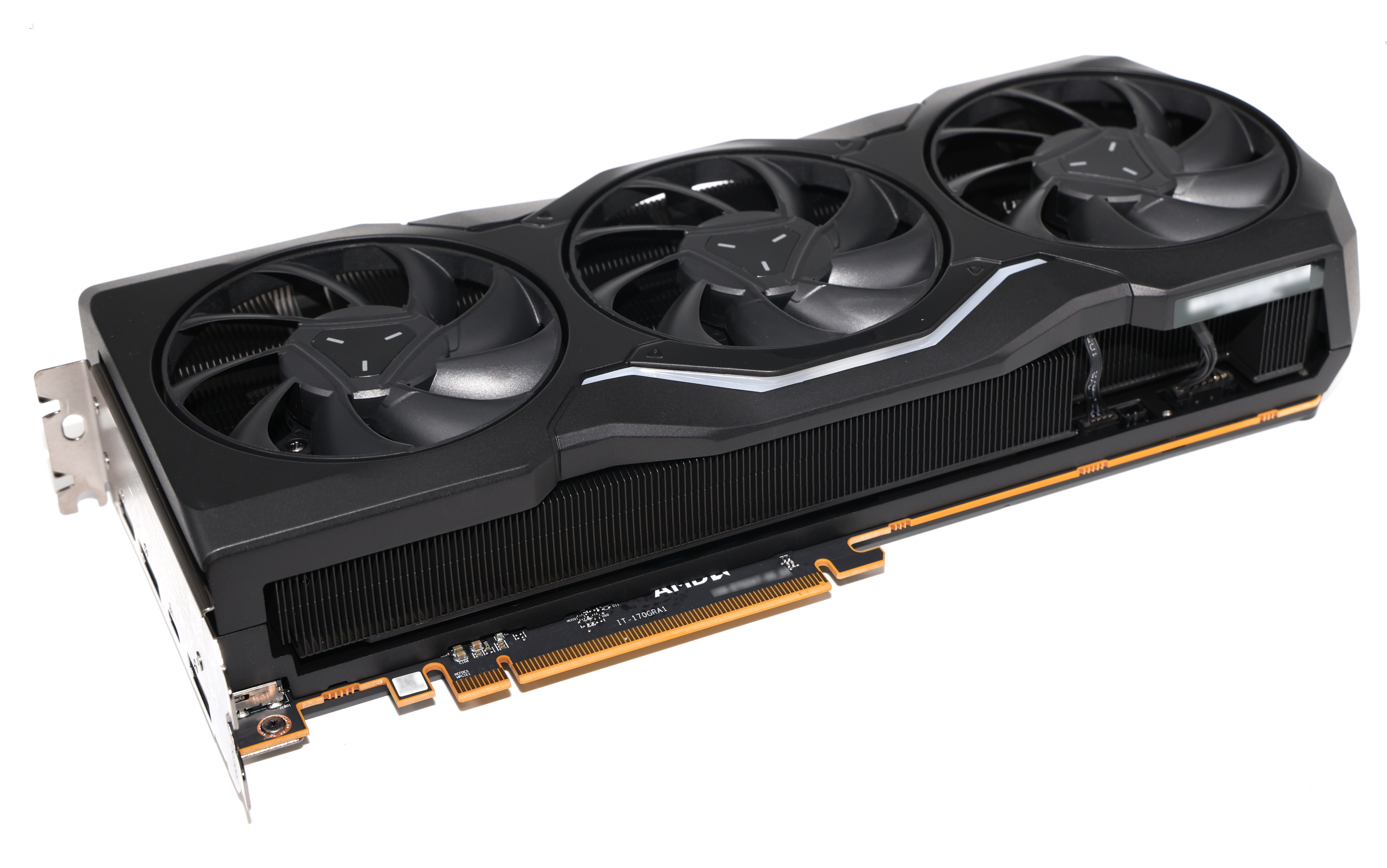
Radeon RX 7000 series (2022)

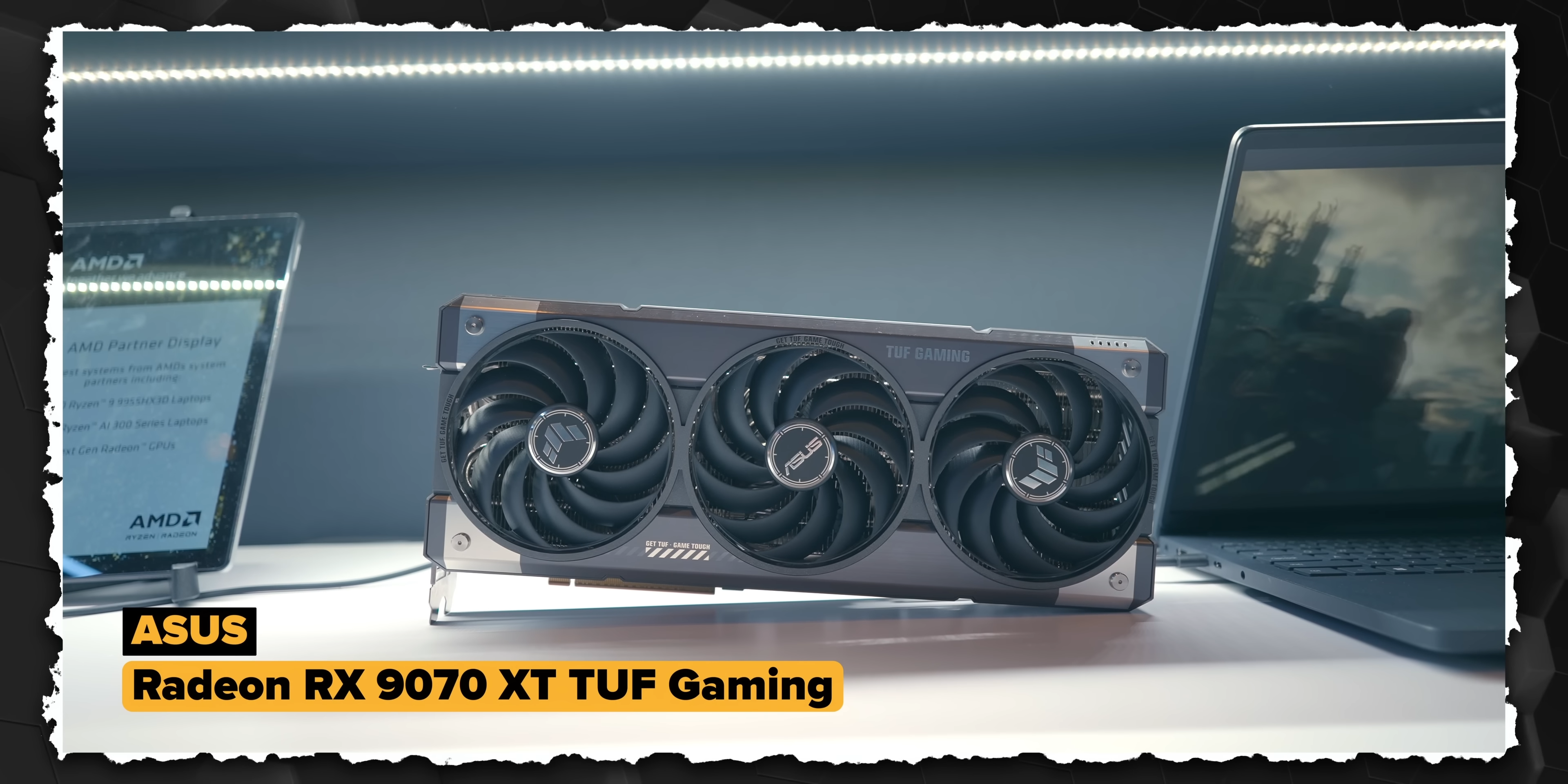
Radeon RX 9000 series (2025)

==== ATI prior to AMD acquisition ====
Lee Ka Lau, Francis Lau, Benny Lau, and Kwok Yuen Ho founded ATI in 1985 as Array Technology Incorporated, renamed later Array Technologies Incorporated and finally ATI Technologies. Working primarily in the OEM field, ATI produced integrated graphics cards for PC manufacturers such as IBM and Commodore. By 1987, ATI had grown into an independent graphics-card retailer, introducing EGA Wonder and VGA Wonder card product lines that year. In the early nineties, they released products able to process graphics without the CPU: in May 1991, the Mach8, in 1992 the Mach32, which offered improved memory bandwidth and GUI acceleration. ATI Technologies went public in 1993, with shares listed on NASDAQ and on the Toronto Stock Exchange.

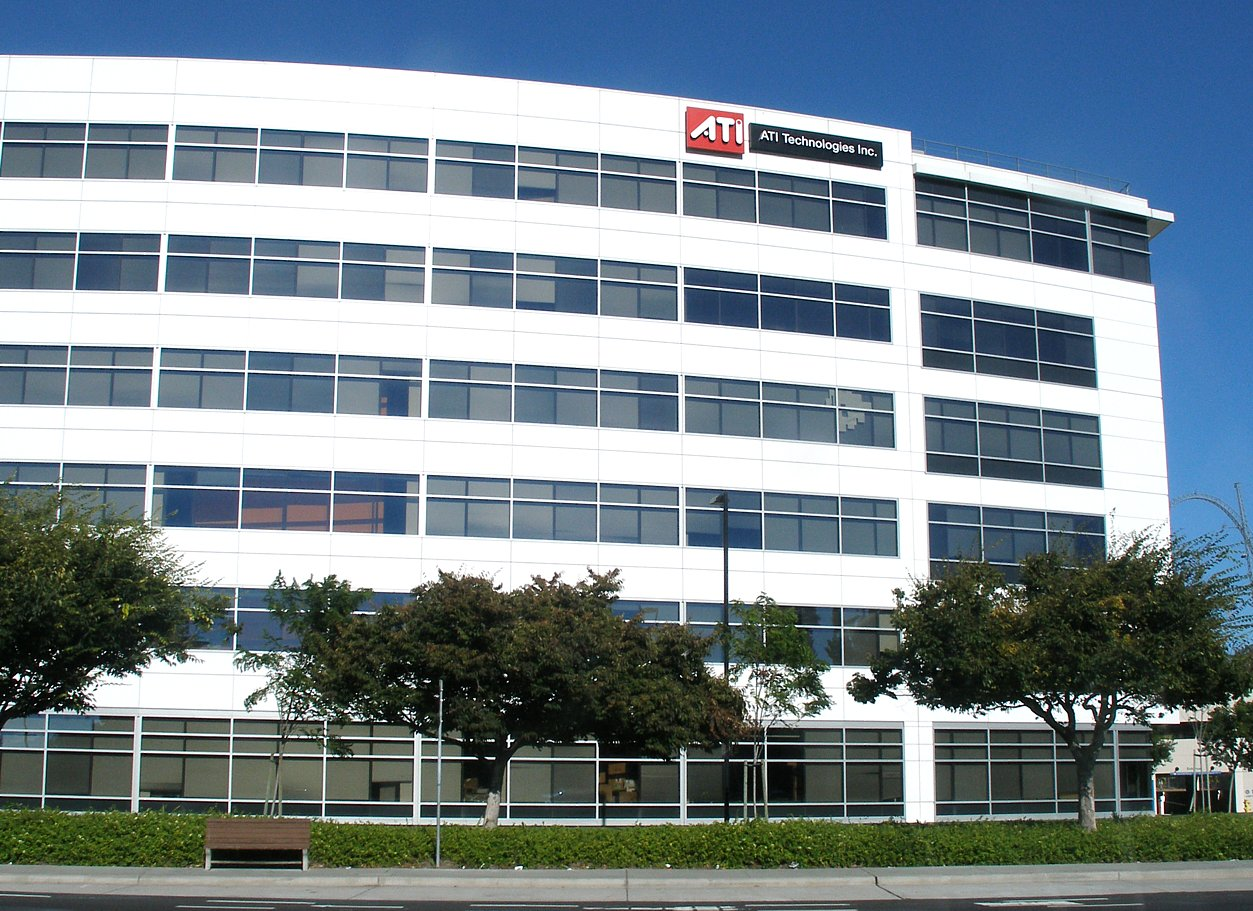
ATI's former Silicon Valley office at 4555 Great America Pkwy, Santa Clara, CA

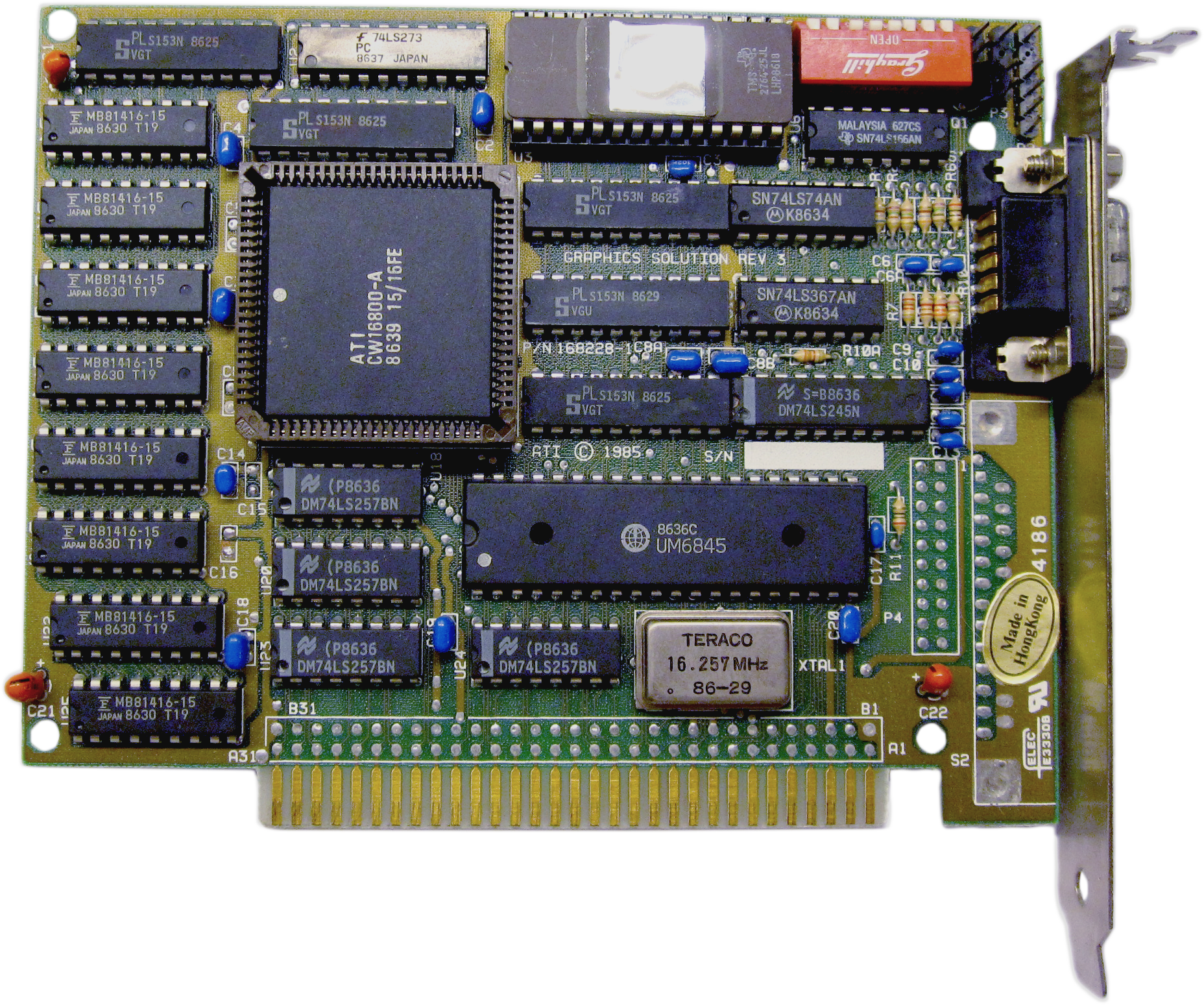
ATI "Graphics Solution Rev 3" from 1985/1986, supporting Hercules graphics. As the PCB reveals, the layout dates from 1985, whereas the marking on the central chip CW16800-A says "8639"—meaning that chip was manufactured in week 39, 1986. Notice UM6845E CRT controller. This card uses the ISA 8-bit interface.

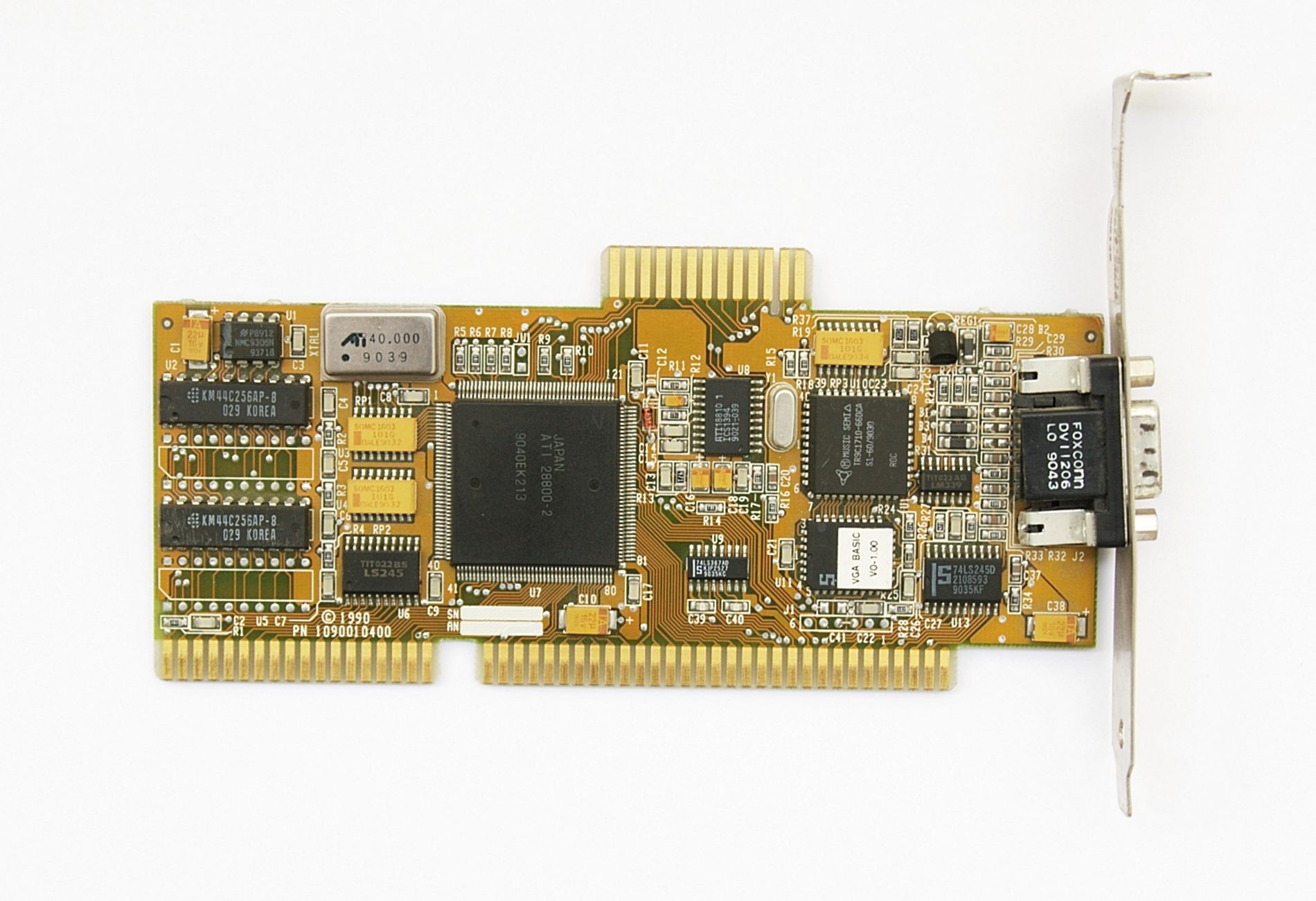
ATI VGA Wonder with 256 KB RAM

In 1994, the Mach64 accelerator debuted, powering the Graphics Xpression and Graphics Pro Turbo, offering hardware support for YUV-to-RGB colour space conversion in addition to hardware zoom; early techniques of hardware-based video acceleration.

ATI introduced its first combination of 2D and 3D accelerator under the name 3D Rage. This chip was based on the Mach 64, but it featured elemental 3D acceleration. The ATI Rage line powered almost the entire range of ATI graphics products. In particular, the Rage Pro was one of the first viable 2D-plus-3D alternatives to 3dfx's 3D-only Voodoo chipset. 3D acceleration in the Rage line advanced from the basic functionality within the initial 3D Rage to a more advanced DirectX 6.0 accelerator in 1999 Rage 128.

The All-in-Wonder product line, introduced in 1996, was the first combination of integrated graphics chip with TV tuner card and the first chip that enabled display of computer graphics on a TV set. The cards featured 3D acceleration powered by ATI's 3D Rage II, 64-bit 2D performance, TV-quality video acceleration, analogue video capture, TV tuner functionality, flicker-free TV-out and stereo TV audio reception.

ATI entered the mobile computing sector by introducing 3D-graphics acceleration to laptops in 1996. The Mobility product line had to meet requirements different from those of desktop PCs, such as minimized power usage, reduced heat output, TMDS output capabilities for laptop screens, and maximized integration. In 1997, ATI acquired Tseng Labs's graphics assets, which included 40 engineers.

The Radeon line of graphics products was unveiled in 2000. The initial Radeon GPU offered an all-new design with DirectX 7.0 3D acceleration, video acceleration, and 2D acceleration. Technology developed for a specific Radeon generation could be built in varying levels of features and performance in order to provide products suited for the entire market range, from high-end to budget to mobile versions.

In 2000, ATI acquired ArtX, which engineered the Flipper graphics chip used in the GameCube video game console. They also created a modified version of the chip (codenamed Hollywood) for the successor of the GameCube, the Wii. Microsoft contracted ATI to design the graphics core (codenamed Xenos) for the Xbox 360. Later in 2005, ATI acquired Terayon's cable modem silicon intellectual property, strengthening their lead in the consumer digital television market. K. Y. Ho remained as chairman of the board until he retired in November 2005. Dave Orton replaced him as the president and CEO of the organization.

On July 24, 2006, a joint announcement revealed that AMD would acquire ATI in a deal valued at $5.6 billion. The acquisition consideration closed on October 25, 2006, and included over $2 billion financed from a loan and 56 million shares of AMD stock. ATI's operations became part of the AMD Graphics Product Group (GPG), and ATI's CEO Dave Orton became the executive vice president of Visual and Media Businesses at AMD until his resignation in 2007. The top-level management was reorganized with the senior vice president and general manager, and the senior vice president and general manager of Consumer Electronics Group, both of whom would report to the CEO of AMD. On August 30, 2010, John Trikola announced that AMD would retire the ATI brand for its graphics chipsets in favour of the AMD name.

==== Radeon within AMD ====
In 2007, the ATI division of AMD released the TeraScale microarchitecture implementing a unified shader model. This design replaced the previous fixed-function hardware of previous graphics cards with multipurpose, programmable shaders. Initially released as part of the GPU for the Xbox 360, this technology would go on to be used in Radeon branded HD 2000 parts. Three generations of TeraScale would be designed and used in parts from 2007 to 2015.

==== Combined GPU and CPU divisions ====
In a 2009 restructuring, AMD merged the CPU and GPU divisions to support the company's APUs, which fused both graphics and general purpose processing. In 2011, AMD released the successor to TeraScale, Graphics Core Next (GCN). This new microarchitecture emphasized GPGPU compute capability in addition to graphics processing, with a particular aim of supporting heterogeneous computing on AMD's APUs. GCN's reduced instruction set ISA allowed for significantly increased compute capability over TeraScale's very long instruction word ISA. Since GCN's introduction with the HD 7970, five generations of the GCN architecture have been produced from 2011 through at least 2018.

==== Radeon Technologies Group ====
In September 2015, AMD separated the graphics technology division of the company into an independent internal unit called the Radeon Technologies Group (RTG), headed by Raja Koduri. This gave the graphics division of AMD autonomy in product design and marketing. The RTG then went on to create and release the Polaris and Vega microarchitectures released in 2016 and 2017, respectively. In particular the Vega, or fifth-generation GCN, microarchitecture includes a number of major revisions to improve performance and compute capabilities.

In November 2017, Raja Koduri left RTG and CEO and President Lisa Su took his position. In January 2018, it was reported that two industry veterans joined RTG, namely Mike Rayfield as senior vice president and general manager of RTG, and David Wang as senior vice president of engineering for RTG. In January 2020, AMD announced that its second-generation RDNA graphics architecture was in development, with the aim of competing with the Nvidia RTX graphics products for performance leadership. In October 2020, AMD announced its new RX 6000 series series GPUs, their first high-end product based on RDNA2 and capable of handling ray-tracing natively, aiming to challenge Nvidia's RTX 3000 GPUs.

=== Semi-custom and game console products ===
In 2012, AMD's then CEO Rory Read began a program to offer semi-custom designs. Rather than AMD simply designing and offering a single product, potential customers could work with AMD to design a custom chip based on AMD's intellectual property. Customers pay a non-recurring engineering fee for design and development, and a purchase price for the resulting semi-custom products. In particular, AMD noted its unique position of offering both x86 and graphics intellectual property. These semi-custom designs would have design wins as the APUs in the PlayStation 4 and Xbox One and the subsequent PlayStation 4 Pro, Xbox One S, Xbox One X, Xbox Series X/S, and PlayStation 5. (Note: Attributed to multiple sources:) Financially, these semi-custom products would represent a majority of the company's revenue in 2016. In November 2017, AMD and Intel announced that Intel would market a product combining in a single package an Intel Core CPU, a semi-custom AMD Radeon GPU, and HBM2 memory.

=== Other hardware ===
==== AMD motherboard chipsets ====
Before the launch of Athlon 64 processors in 2003, AMD designed chipsets for its processors spanning the K6 and K7 processor generations. The chipsets include the AMD-640, AMD-751, and the AMD-761 chipsets. The situation changed in 2003 with the release of Athlon 64 processors, and AMD chose not to further design its own chipsets for its desktop processors while opening the desktop platform to allow other firms to design chipsets. This was the "Open Platform Management Architecture" with ATI, VIA and SiS developing its own chipset for Athlon 64 processors and later Athlon 64 X2 and Athlon 64 FX processors, including the Quad FX platform chipset from Nvidia.

The initiative went further with the release of Opteron server processors as AMD stopped the design of server chipsets in 2004 after releasing the AMD-8111 chipset, and again opened the server platform for firms to develop chipsets for Opteron processors. As of today, Nvidia and Broadcom are the sole designing firms of server chipsets for Opteron processors.

As the company completed the acquisition of ATI Technologies in 2006, the firm gained the ATI design team for chipsets which previously designed the Radeon Xpress 200 and the Radeon Xpress 3200 chipsets. AMD then renamed the chipsets for AMD processors under AMD branding (for instance, the CrossFire Xpress 3200 chipset was renamed as AMD 580X CrossFire chipset). In February 2007, AMD announced the first AMD-branded chipset since 2004 with the release of the AMD 690G chipset (previously under the development codename RS690), targeted at mainstream IGP computing. It was the industry's first to implement a HDMI 1.2 port on motherboards, shipping for more than a million units. While ATI had aimed at releasing an Intel IGP chipset, the plan was scrapped and the inventories of Radeon Xpress 1250 (codenamed RS600, sold under ATI brand) was sold to two OEMs, Abit and ASRock. Although AMD stated the firm would still produce Intel chipsets, Intel had not granted the license of 1333 MHz FSB to ATI.

On November 15, 2007, AMD announced a new chipset series portfolio, the AMD 7-Series chipsets, covering from the enthusiast multi-graphics segment to the value IGP segment, to replace the AMD 480/570/580 chipsets and AMD 690 series chipsets, marking AMD's first enthusiast multi-graphics chipset. Discrete graphics chipsets were launched on November 15, 2007, as part of the codenamed Spider desktop platform, and IGP chipsets were launched at a later time in spring 2008 as part of the codenamed Cartwheel platform.

AMD returned to the server chipsets market with the AMD 800S series server chipsets. It includes support for up to six SATA 6.0 Gbit/s ports, the C6 power state, which is featured in Fusion processors and AHCI 1.2 with SATA FIS-based switching support. This is a chipset family supporting Phenom processors and Quad FX enthusiast platform (890FX), IGP (890GX).

With the advent of AMD's APUs in 2011, traditional northbridge features such as the connection to graphics and the PCI Express controller were incorporated into the APU die. Accordingly, APUs were connected to a single chip chipset, renamed the Fusion Controller Hub (FCH), which primarily provided southbridge functionality.

AMD released new chipsets in 2017 to support the release of its new Ryzen products. As the Zen microarchitecture already includes much of the northbridge connectivity, the AM4-based chipsets primarily varied in the number of additional PCI Express lanes, USB connections, and SATA connections available. These AM4 chipsets were designed in conjunction with ASMedia.

==== Embedded products ====
===== Embedded CPUs =====
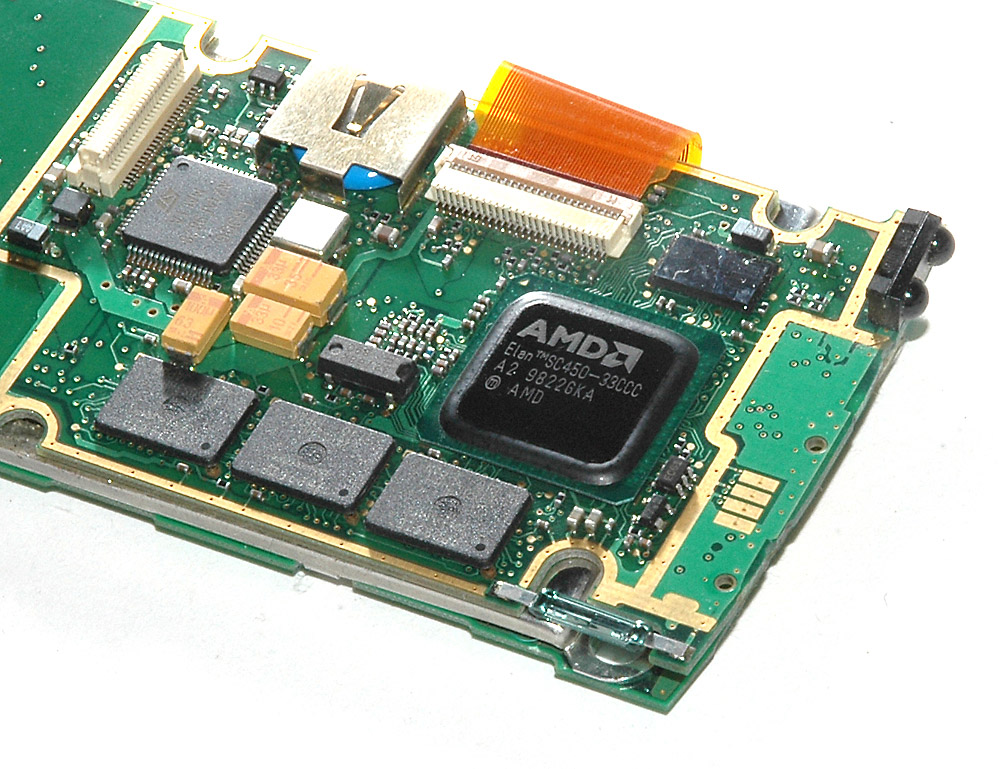
An AMD Élan SC450 in Nokia 9110 Communicator

In the early 1990s, AMD began marketing a series of embedded system-on-a-chips (SoCs) called AMD Élan, starting with the SC300 and SC310. Both combines a 32-Bit, Am386SX, low-voltage 25 MHz or 33 MHz CPU with memory controller, PC/AT peripheral controllers, real-time clock, PLL clock generators and ISA bus interface. The SC300 integrates in addition two PC card slots and a CGA-compatible LCD controller. They were followed in 1996 by the SC4xx types, now supporting VESA Local Bus and using the Am486 with up to 100 MHz clock speed. An SC450 at 33 MHz, for example, was used in the Nokia 9110 Communicator. In 1999 the SC520 was announced. Using an Am586 with 100 MHz or 133 MHz and supporting SDRAM and PCI it was the latest member of the series.

In February 2002, AMD acquired Alchemy Semiconductor for its Alchemy line of MIPS processors for the hand-held and portable media player markets. On June 13, 2006, AMD officially announced that the line was to be transferred to Raza Microelectronics, Inc., a designer of MIPS processors for embedded applications.

In August 2003, AMD also purchased the Geode business which was originally the Cyrix MediaGX from National Semiconductor to augment its existing line of embedded x86 processor products. During the second quarter of 2004, it launched new low-power Geode NX processors based on the K7 Thoroughbred architecture with speeds of fanless processors 667 MHz and 1 GHz, and 1.4 GHz processor with fan, of TDP 25 W. This technology is used in a variety of embedded systems (Casino slot machines and customer kiosks for instance), several UMPC designs in Asia markets, and the OLPC XO-1 computer, an inexpensive laptop computer intended to be distributed to children in developing countries around the world. The Geode LX processor was announced in 2005 and is said will continue to be available through 2015.

AMD has also introduced 64-bit processors into its embedded product line, starting with the AMD Opteron processor. Leveraging the high throughput enabled through HyperTransport and the Direct Connect Architecture these server-class processors have been targeted at high-end telecom and storage applications. In 2007, AMD added the AMD Athlon, AMD Turion, and Mobile AMD Sempron processors to its embedded product line. Leveraging the same 64-bit instruction set and Direct Connect Architecture as the AMD Opteron but at lower power levels, these processors were well suited to a variety of traditional embedded applications. Throughout 2007 and into 2008, AMD continued to add both single-core Mobile AMD Sempron and AMD Athlon processors and dual-core AMD Athlon X2 and AMD Turion processors to its embedded product line and now offers embedded 64-bit solutions starting with 8 W TDP Mobile AMD Sempron and AMD Athlon processors for fan-less designs up to multi-processor systems leveraging multi-core AMD Opteron processors all supporting longer than standard availability.

The ATI acquisition in 2006 included the Imageon and Xilleon product lines. In late 2008, the entire handheld division was sold off to Qualcomm, who have since produced the Adreno series. Also in 2008, the Xilleon division was sold to Broadcom.

In April 2007, AMD announced the release of the M690T integrated graphics chipset for embedded designs. This enabled AMD to offer complete processor and chipset solutions targeted at embedded applications requiring high-performance 3D and video such as emerging digital signage, kiosk, and Point of Sale applications. The M690T was followed by the M690E specifically for embedded applications which removed the TV output, which required Macrovision licensing for OEMs, and enabled native support for dual TMDS outputs, enabling dual independent DVI interfaces.

In January 2011, AMD announced the AMD Embedded G-Series Accelerated Processing Unit. This was the first APU for embedded applications. These were followed by updates in 2013 and 2016.

In May 2012, AMD announced the AMD Embedded R-Series Accelerated Processing Unit. This family of products incorporates the Bulldozer CPU architecture, and Discrete-class Radeon HD 7000G Series graphics. This was followed by a system-on-a-chip (SoC) version in 2015 which offered a faster CPU and faster graphics, with support for DDR4 SDRAM memory.

===== Embedded graphics =====
AMD builds graphic processors for use in embedded systems. They can be found in anything from casinos to healthcare, with a large portion of products being used in industrial machines. These products include a complete graphics processing device in a compact multi-chip module including RAM and the GPU. ATI began offering embedded GPUs with the E2400 in 2008. Since then, AMD has released regular updates to its embedded GPU lineup in 2009, 2011, 2015, and 2016; reflecting improvements in its GPU technology.

==== AMD FPGAs ====
In October 2020, AMD announced its acquisition of Xilinx, which was completed on February 14, 2022, through an all-stock transaction valued at approximately $60 billion. Xilinx remained a wholly owned subsidiary of AMD until the brand was phased out in June 2023, with Xilinx's product lines now branded under AMD.

=== Current product lines ===
==== CPU and APU products ====
AMD's portfolio of CPUs and APUs as of 2020

- Athlon – brand of entry level CPUs (Excavator) and APUs (Ryzen)
- A-series – Excavator-class consumer desktop and laptop APUs
- G-series – Excavator- and Jaguar-class low-power embedded APUs
- Ryzen – brand of consumer CPUs and APUs
- Ryzen Threadripper – brand of prosumer/professional CPUs
- R-series – Excavator class high-performance embedded APUs
- Epyc – brand of server CPUs
- Opteron – brand of microserver APUs

==== Graphics products ====
AMD's portfolio of dedicated graphics processors as of 2017

- Radeon – brand for consumer line of graphics cards; the brand name originated with ATI.
  - Mobility Radeon offers power-optimized versions of Radeon graphics chips for use in laptops.
- Radeon Pro – Workstation graphics card brand. Successor to the FirePro brand.
- Radeon Instinct – brand of server and workstation targeted machine learning and GPGPU products

=== Radeon-branded products ===
==== RAM ====
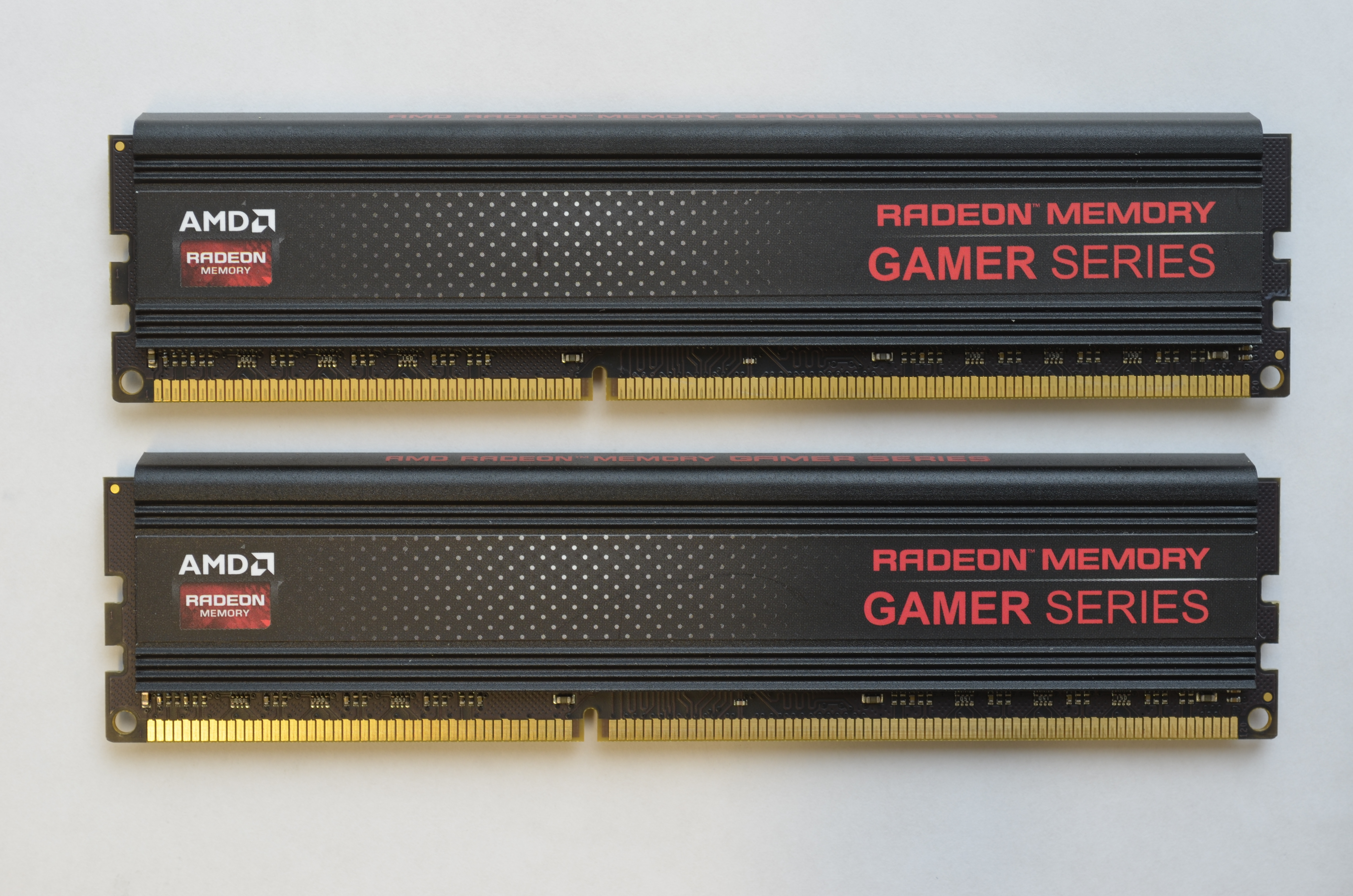
AMD Radeon memory

In 2011, AMD began selling Radeon branded DDR3 SDRAM to support the higher bandwidth needs of AMD's APUs. While the RAM is sold by AMD, it was manufactured by Patriot Memory and VisionTek. This was later followed by higher speeds of gaming oriented DDR3 memory in 2013. Radeon branded DDR4 SDRAM memory was released in 2015, despite no AMD CPUs or APUs supporting DDR4 at the time. AMD noted in 2017 that these products are "mostly distributed in Eastern Europe" and that it continues to be active in the business.

==== Solid-state drives ====
AMD announced in 2014 that it would sell Radeon branded solid-state drives manufactured by OCZ with capacities up to 480 GB and using the SATA interface.

== Technologies ==
=== CPU hardware ===
As of 2017 technologies found in AMD CPU/APU and other products include:

- HyperTransport – a high-bandwidth, low-latency system bus used in AMD's CPU and APU products
- Infinity Fabric – a derivative of HyperTransport used as the communication bus in AMD's Zen microarchitecture

=== Graphics hardware ===
As of 2017 technologies found in AMD GPU products include:

- AMD Eyefinity – facilitates multi-monitor setup of up to 6 monitors per graphics card
- AMD FreeSync – display synchronization based on the VESA Adaptive Sync standard
- AMD TrueAudio – acceleration of audio calculations
- AMD XConnect – allows the use of External GPU enclosures through Thunderbolt 3
- AMD CrossFire – multi-GPU technology allowing the simultaneous use of multiple GPUs
- Unified Video Decoder (UVD) – acceleration of video decompression (decoding)
- Video Coding Engine (VCE) – acceleration of video compression (encoding)

=== Software ===
AMD has taken actions towards opening its software tools above the firmware level in the past decade.

Software not explicitly stated as being free can be assumed to be proprietary.

==== Distribution ====
AMD Radeon Software is the default channel for official software distribution from AMD. It includes both free and proprietary software components, and supports both Microsoft Windows and Linux.

==== CPU ====
- AOCC is AMD's optimizing proprietary C/C++ compiler based on LLVM and available for Linux.
- AMDuProf is AMD's CPU performance and Power profiling tool suite, available for Linux and Windows.
- AMD has also taken an active part in developing coreboot, an open-source project aimed at replacing the proprietary BIOS firmware. This cooperation ceased in 2013, but AMD has indicated recently that it is considering releasing source code so that Ryzen can be compatible with coreboot in the future.

==== GPU ====
Most notable public AMD software is on the GPU side.

AMD has opened both its graphic and compute stacks:

- GPUOpen is AMD's graphics stack, which includes for example FidelityFX Super Resolution.
- ROCm (Radeon Open Compute platform) is AMD's compute stack for machine learning and high-performance computing, based on the LLVM compiler technologies. Under the ROCm project, AMDgpu is AMD's open-source device driver supporting the GCN and following architectures, available for Linux. This latter driver component is used both by the graphics and compute stacks.

==== Other ====
- AMD conducts open research on heterogeneous computing.
- Other AMD software includes the AMD Core Math Library, and open-source software including the AMD Performance Library.
- AMD contributes to open-source projects, including working with Sun Microsystems to enhance OpenSolaris and Sun xVM on the AMD platform. AMD also maintains its own Open64 compiler distribution and contributes its changes back to the community.
- In 2008, AMD released the low-level programming specifications for its GPUs, and works with the X.Org Foundation to develop drivers for AMD graphics cards.
- Extensions for software parallelism (xSP), aimed at speeding up programs to enable multi-threaded and multi-core processing, announced in Technology Analyst Day 2007. One of the initiatives being discussed since August 2007 is the Light Weight Profiling (LWP), providing internal hardware monitor with runtimes, to observe information about executing process and help the re-design of software to be optimized with multi-core and even multi-threaded programs. Another one is the extension of Streaming SIMD Extension (SSE) instruction set, the SSE5.
- Codenamed SIMFIRE – interoperability testing tool for the Desktop and mobile Architecture for System Hardware (DASH) open architecture.
- In March 2025 AMD announced Instella an open source large language model.
- AMD Chipset Software, the drivers and software package for AMD CPUs and southbridge chipsets.

== Fabrication ==
Previously, AMD produced its chips at company-owned semiconductor foundries. AMD pursued a strategy of collaboration with other semiconductor manufacturers IBM and Motorola to co-develop production technologies. AMD's founder Jerry Sanders termed this the "Virtual Gorilla" strategy to compete with Intel's significantly greater investments in fabrication. Two former fabrication sites in Sunnyvale are listed as a Superfund site, added in 1986 and 1990 when volatile organic compounds were discovered in groundwater. Acid neutralization system (ANS) tank vaults were discovered with holes when excavated with the contaminated soil.

In 2008, AMD spun off its chip foundries into an independent company named GlobalFoundries. This breakup of the company was attributed to the increasing costs of each process node. The Emirate of Abu Dhabi purchased the newly created company through its subsidiary Advanced Technology Investment Company (ATIC), purchasing the final stake from AMD in 2009.

With the spin-off of its foundries, AMD became a fabless semiconductor manufacturer, designing products to be produced at for-hire foundries. Part of the GlobalFoundries spin-off included an agreement with AMD to produce some number of products at GlobalFoundries. Both prior to the spin-off and after, AMD has pursued production with other foundries including TSMC and Samsung. It has been argued that this would reduce risk for AMD by decreasing dependence on any one foundry which has caused issues in the past.

In 2018, AMD started shifting the production of its CPUs and GPUs to TSMC, following GlobalFoundries' announcement that it was halting development of its 7 nm process. AMD revised its wafer purchase requirement with GlobalFoundries in 2019, allowing AMD to freely choose foundries for 7 nm nodes and below, while maintaining purchase agreements for 12 nm and above through 2021.

== Corporate affairs ==
=== List of CEOs ===
Name	Years	Position, education
Jerry Sanders	1969–2002	Founder, electrical engineer
Hector Ruiz	2002–2008	Electrical engineer
Dirk Meyer	2008–2011	Computer engineer
Rory Read	2011–2014	Information Systems
Lisa Su	2014–present	Electrical engineer

=== Business trends ===
The key trends for AMD are (as of the financial year ending in late December):

	Revenue (US$ bn)	Net profit (US$ m)	Total assets (US$ bn)	Employees
2017	5.3	43	3.5	8,900
2018	6.4	337	4.5	10,100
2019	6.7	341	6.0	11,400
2020	9.7	2,490	8.9	12,600
2021	16.4	3,162	12.4	15,500
2022	23.6	1,320	67.5	25,000
2023	22.6	854	67.8	26,000
2024	25.7	1,641	69.2	28,000
2025	34.6	4,335	76.9	31,000

=== Partnerships ===
AMD uses strategic industry partnerships to further its business interests and to rival Intel's dominance and resources:

- A partnership between AMD and Alpha Processor Inc. developed HyperTransport, a point-to-point interconnect standard which was turned over to an industry standards body for finalization. It is now used in modern motherboards that are compatible with AMD processors.
- AMD also formed a strategic partnership with IBM, under which AMD gained silicon on insulator (SOI) manufacturing technology, and detailed advice on 90 nm implementation. AMD announced that the partnership would extend to 2011 for 32 nm and 22 nm fabrication-related technologies.
- To facilitate processor distribution and sales, AMD is loosely partnered with end-user companies, such as HP, Dell, Asus, Acer, and Microsoft.
- In 1993, AMD established a 50–50 partnership with Fujitsu called FASL, and merged into a new company called FASL LLC in 2003. The joint venture went public under the name Spansion and ticker symbol SPSN in December 2005, with AMD shares dropping 37%. AMD no longer directly participates in the Flash memory devices market now as AMD entered into a non-competition agreement on December 21, 2005, with Fujitsu and Spansion, pursuant to which it agreed not to directly or indirectly engage in a business that manufactures or supplies standalone semiconductor devices (including single-chip, multiple-chip or system devices) containing only Flash memory.
- On May 18, 2006, Dell announced that it would roll out new servers based on AMD's Opteron chips by year's end, thus ending an exclusive relationship with Intel. In September 2006, Dell began offering AMD Athlon X2 chips in its desktop lineup.
- In June 2011, HP announced new business and consumer notebooks equipped with the latest versions of AMD APUs – accelerated processing units. AMD will power HP's Intel-based business notebooks as well.
- In the spring of 2013, AMD announced that it would be powering all three major next-generation consoles. The Xbox One and Sony PlayStation 4 are both powered by a custom-built AMD APU, and the Nintendo Wii U is powered by an AMD GPU. According to AMD, having its processors in all three of these consoles will greatly assist developers with cross-platform development to competing consoles and PCs and increased support for its products across the board.
- AMD has entered into an agreement with Hindustan Semiconductor Manufacturing Corporation (HSMC) for the production of AMD products in India.
- AMD is a founding member of the HSA Foundation which aims to ease the use of a Heterogeneous System Architecture. A Heterogeneous System Architecture is intended to use both central processing units and graphics processors to complete computational tasks.
- AMD announced in 2016 that it was creating a joint venture to produce x86 server chips for the Chinese market.
- On May 7, 2019, it was reported that the U.S. Department of Energy, Oak Ridge National Laboratory, and Cray Inc., are working in collaboration with AMD to develop the Frontier exascale supercomputer. Featuring the AMD Epyc CPUs and Radeon GPUs, the supercomputer is set to produce more than 1.5 exaflops (peak double-precision) in computing performance. It is expected to debut sometime in 2021.
- On March 5, 2020, it was announced that the U.S. Department of Energy, Lawrence Livermore National Laboratory, and HPE are working in collaboration with AMD to develop the El Capitan exascale supercomputer. Featuring the AMD Epyc CPUs and Radeon GPUs, the supercomputer is set to produce more than 2 exaflops (peak double-precision) in computing performance. It is expected to debut in 2023.
- In the summer of 2020, it was reported that AMD would be powering the next-generation console offerings from Microsoft and Sony.
- On November 8, 2021, AMD announced a partnership with Meta to make the chips used in the Metaverse.
- In January 2022, AMD partnered with Samsung to develop a mobile processor to be used in future products. The processor was named Exynos 2200 and works with the AMD RDNA 2 architecture.
- In October 2025, AMD and OpenAI announced a multibillion-dollar partnership to collaborate on AI data center development. OpenAI committed to purchasing 6 gigawatts worth of AMD chips, which is expected to translate to "tens of billions" of dollars in new revenue for AMD by 2027. OpenAI is receiving warrants for up to 160 million AMD shares based certain development milestones and AMD's stock price movement.

=== Litigation with Intel ===
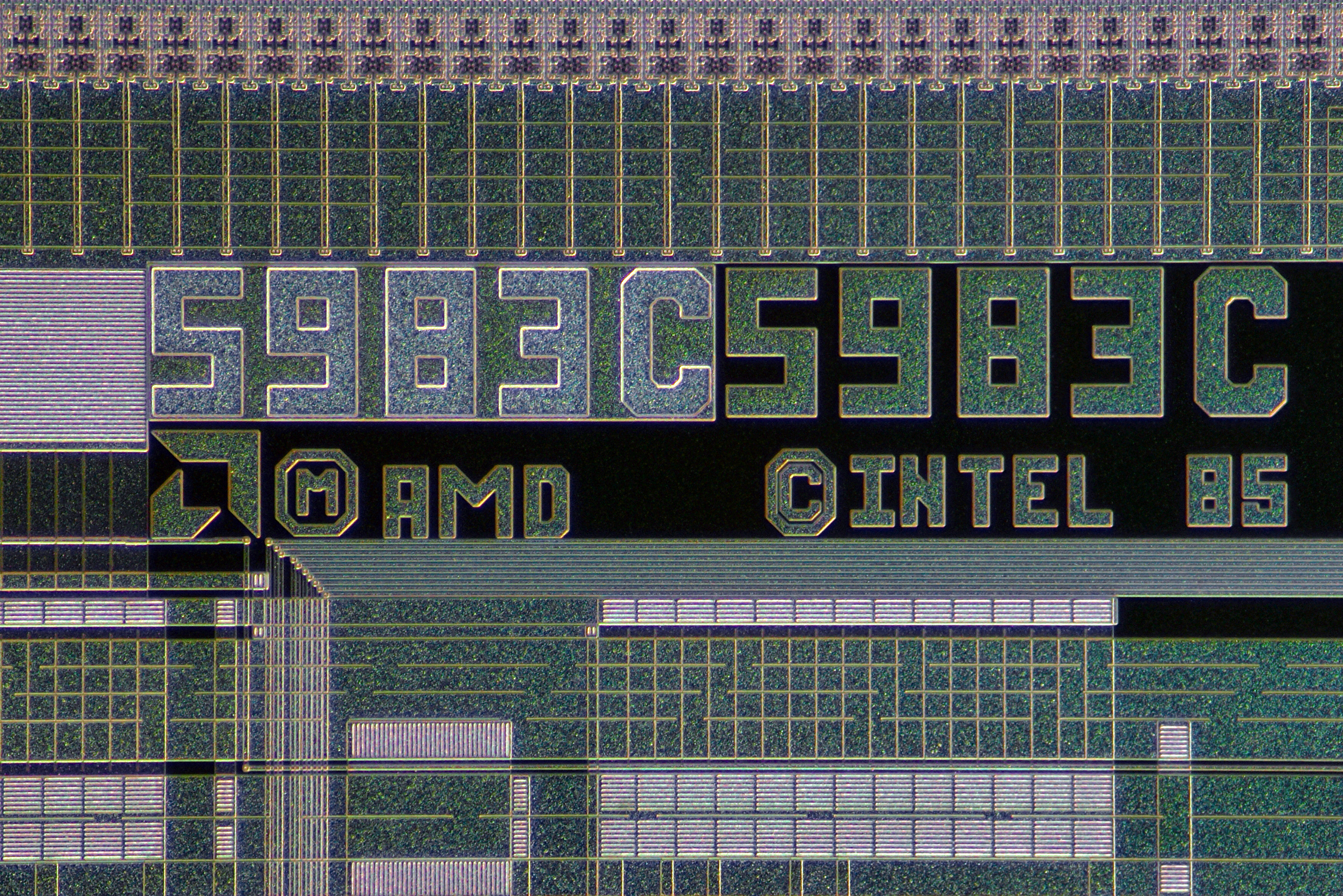
AMD processor with Intel copyright

AMD has a long history of litigation with former (and current) partner and x86 creator Intel.

- In 1986, Intel broke an agreement it had with AMD to allow them to produce Intel's microchips for IBM; AMD filed for arbitration in 1987 and the arbitrator decided in AMD's favor in 1992. Intel disputed this, and the case ended up in the Supreme Court of California. In 1994, that court upheld the arbitrator's decision and awarded damages for breach of contract.
- In 1990, Intel brought a copyright infringement action alleging illegal use of its 287 microcode. The case ended in 1994 with a jury finding for AMD and its right to use Intel's microcode in its microprocessors through the 486 generation.
- In 1997, Intel filed suit against AMD and Cyrix Corp. for misuse of the term MMX. AMD and Intel settled, with AMD acknowledging MMX as a trademark owned by Intel, and with Intel granting AMD rights to market the AMD K6 MMX processor.
- In 2005, following an investigation, the Japan Federal Trade Commission found Intel guilty of a number of violations. On June 27, 2005, AMD won an antitrust suit against Intel in Japan, and on the same day, AMD filed a broad antitrust complaint against Intel in the U.S. Federal District Court in Delaware. The complaint alleges systematic use of secret rebates, special discounts, threats, and other means used by Intel to lock AMD processors out of the global market. Since the start of this action, the court has issued subpoenas to major computer manufacturers including Acer, Dell, Lenovo, HP and Toshiba.
- In November 2009, Intel agreed to pay AMD $1.25 billion and renew a five-year patent cross-licensing agreement as part of a deal to settle all outstanding legal disputes between them.

=== Guinness World Record achievement ===
- On August 31, 2011, in Austin, Texas, AMD achieved a Guinness World Record for the "Highest frequency of a computer processor": 8.429 GHz. The company ran an 8-core FX-8150 processor with only one active module (two cores), and cooled with liquid helium. The previous record was 8.308 GHz, with an Intel Celeron 352 (one core).
- On November 1, 2011, geek.com reported that Andre Yang, an overclocker from Taiwan, used an FX-8150 to set another record: 8.461 GHz.
- On November 19, 2012, Andre Yang used an FX-8350 to set another record: 8.794 GHz.

=== Corporate responsibility ===
- In its 2022 report, AMD stated that it aimed to embed environmental sustainability across its business, promote safe and responsible workplaces in its global supply chain and advance stronger communities.
- In 2022, AMD achieved a 19 percent reduction in its Scope 1 and 2 GHG emissions compared to 2020. Based on AMD calculations that are third-party verified (limited level assurance).

=== Other initiatives ===
- The Green Grid, founded by AMD together with other founders, such as IBM, Sun and Microsoft, to seek lower power consumption for grids.

== Sponsorships ==
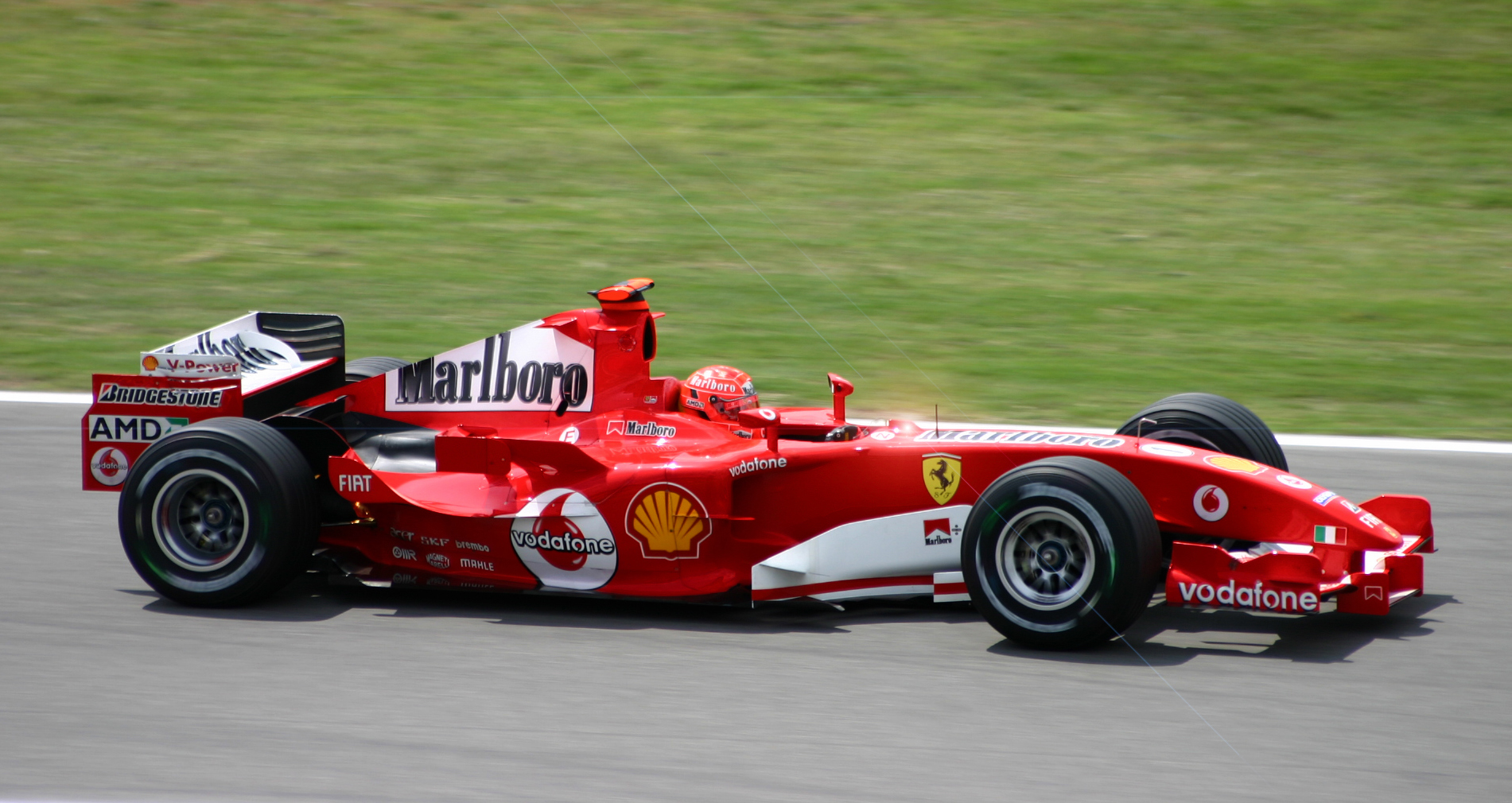
The AMD-logo on the rear spoiler of Michael Schumacher's F2005 from Ferrari, showing AMD's sponsorship at the 2005 German Grand Prix

AMD's sponsorship of Formula 1 racing began in 2002, and since 2020 has sponsored the Mercedes-AMG Petronas team. AMD was also a sponsor of the BMW Sauber and Scuderia Ferrari Formula 1 teams together with Intel, Vodafone, AT&T, Pernod Ricard and Diageo. On 18 April 2018, AMD began a multi-year sponsorship with Scuderia Ferrari. In February 2020, just prior to the start of the 2020 race season, the Mercedes Formula 1 team announced it was adding AMD to its sponsorship portfolio. AMD began a sponsorship deal with Victory Five (V5) for the League of Legends Pro League (LPL) in 2022. AMD was a sponsor of the Chinese Dota Pro Circuit together with Perfect World.

In February 2024, AMD was a Diamond sponsor for the World Artificial Intelligence Cannes Festival (WAICF).

AMD was a Platinum sponsor for the HPE Discover 2024, an event hosted by Hewlett Packard Enterprise to showcase technology for government and business customers. The event was held from 17 to 20 June 2024 in Las Vegas.

== See also ==
- 3DNow!
- Cool'n'Quiet
- Bill Gaede
- List of AMD accelerated processing units
- List of AMD chipsets
- List of AMD graphics processing units
- List of AMD processors
- List of ATI chipsets
- PowerNow!
