= Control station =

Control station may refer to:

- Satellite ground control station
- UAV ground control station
- Kilometre zero, point that control road distances
- Mile zero, station that control road distances
- Primary airport control station, centralized distance measurement point
- Ship station, for centralized control

== See also ==
- Control (disambiguation)
- Control point (disambiguation)
- Station (disambiguation)
