= PACS =

PACS is an acronym with several meanings:

== Medicine ==
- Post-acute COVID-19 syndrome; see Long COVID
- Partial anterior circulation stroke syndrome, the symptoms of a type of an ischemic stroke
- Picture archiving and communication system, in medical imaging
- Premature atrial contractions (plural)

== Organizations and establishments ==
- Pacte civil de solidarité, a form of civil union in France
- Palo Alto Chinese School, Palo Alto, California, USA
- Political action committees, groups organized to elect or defeat political candidates (plural)
- Poorest Areas Civil Society Program (2001–2008), a defunct Indian social welfare program
- Primary Agricultural Credit Society, co-operative credit institutions in India
- Provisional Army of the Confederate States, of the Confederate States Army (American Civil War)

== Physics and astronomy ==
- Physics and Astronomy Classification Scheme, developed by the American Institute of Physics
- Photodetecting Array Camera and Spectrometer, an instrument of the Herschel Space Observatory

== Other ==
- Primary airport control station, a survey marker established in the vicinity of an airport
- Personal access control system. Gates, barriers and turnstiles that provide security for restricted areas on buildings and sites.
- Cape Sarichef Airport (ICAO airport code), on Unimak Island of the Aleutian Islands, Alaska
- Peace and conflict studies, an academic field that identifies and analyzes violent and nonviolent behaviors of social conflicts

== See also ==
- PAC (disambiguation)
