= Uncontrolled =

Uncontrolled may refer to:

== Entertainment ==
=== Music ===
- Uncontrolled (album), a 2012 album by Japanese musician Namie Amuro
- Uncontrolled Substance, a 1999 album by Wu-Tang Clan artist Inspectah Deck
- Spiritually Uncontrolled Art, 1992 by Swedish death metal group Liers in Wait

== Science and technology ==
- Uncontrolled decompression, an unplanned for drop in pressure
- Uncontrolled format string, a security software vulnerability

== Other ==
- Uncontrolled airspace, an area of the world where air traffic control is deemed unnecessary
- Uncontrolled intersection, a road intersection without signals such as traffic lights or signs
- Uncontrolled waste, a category of hazardous waste

== See also ==
- Control (disambiguation)
- Control point (disambiguation)
- Controller (disambiguation)
