= AMD Élan =

Family of system on a chip microprocessor

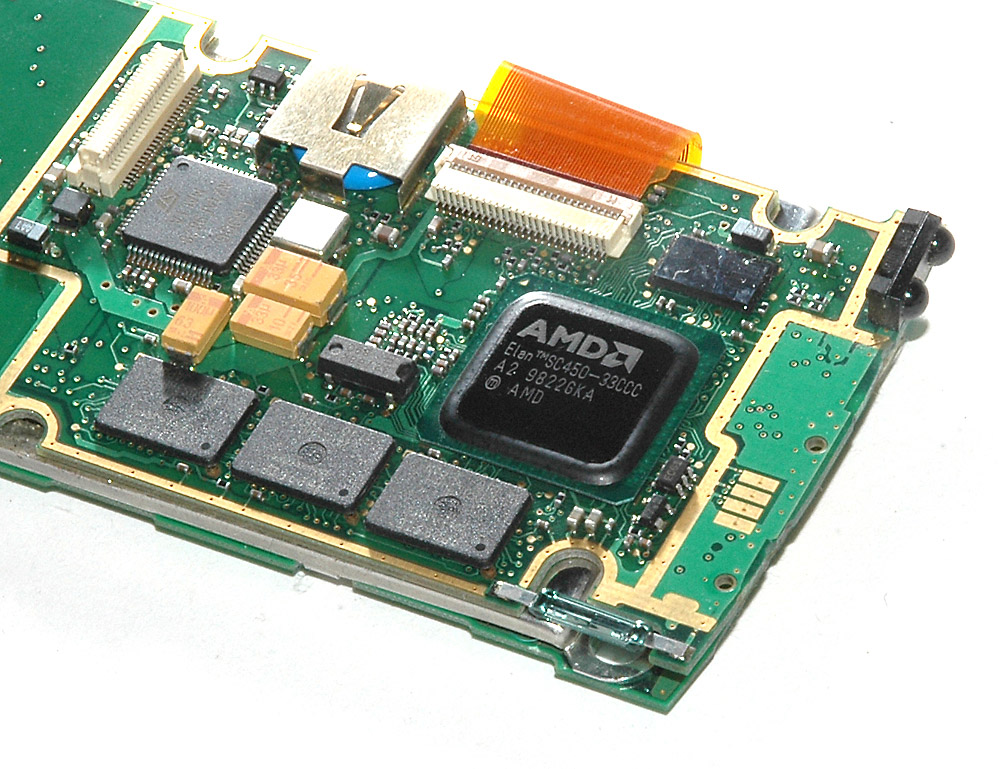
AMD Élan SC450 in Nokia 9110 Communicator

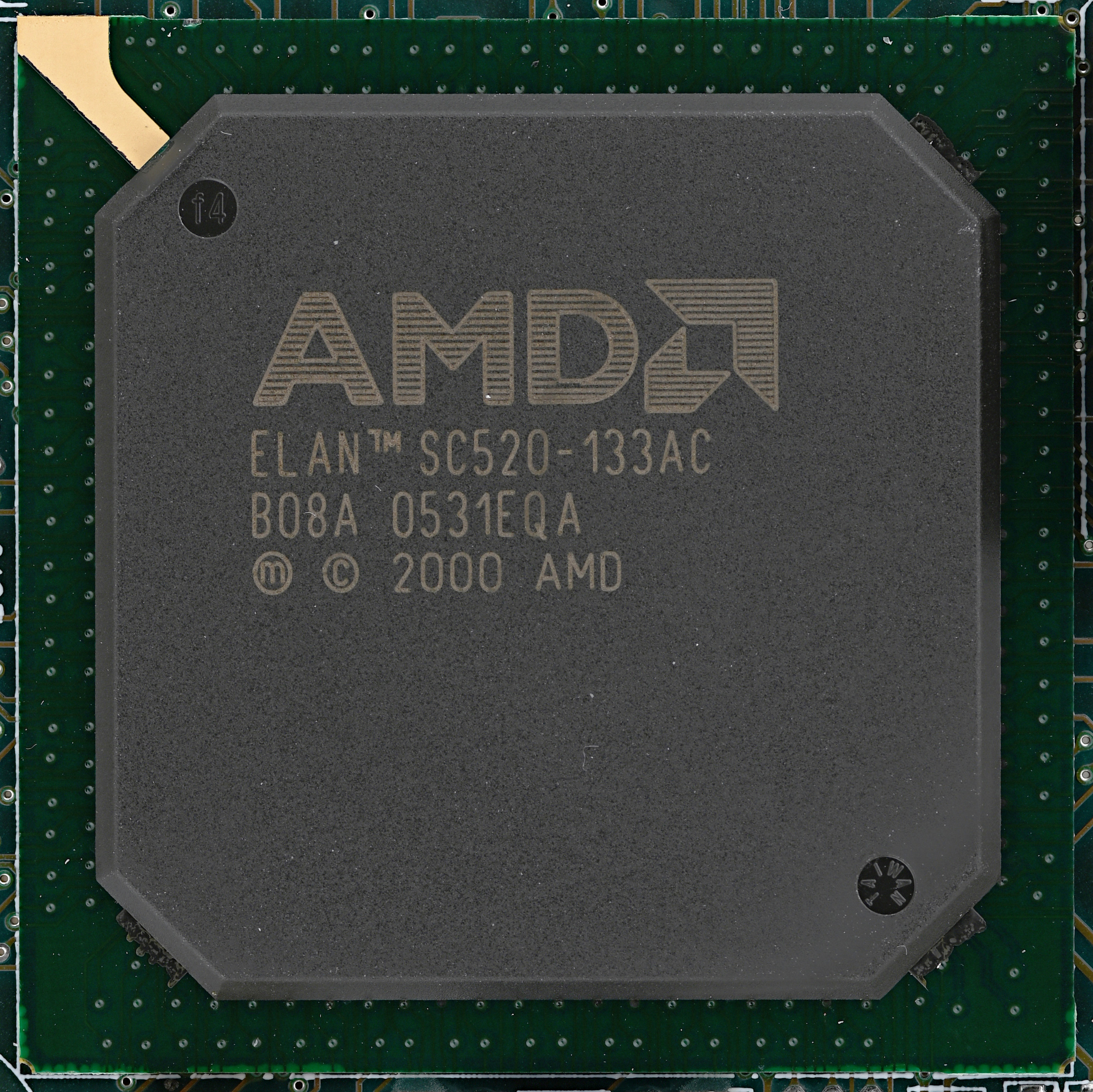
AMD Élan SC520-133

AMD Élan is a family of 32-bit systems on a chip (SoCs) marketed by AMD based on x86 microprocessors. They are designed for use in embedded systems and were backed with a long-term supply guarantee to meet the needs of embedded processors. However, when AMD acquired the Geode division from National Semiconductor in August 2003, the product was suddenly discontinued. The Élan processors saw a reasonable amount of use in the embedded world.

In October 1993, AMD introduced the Am386SC processor, which integrated an Am386SXLV CPU core with a collection of PC/AT-compatible peripherals. This processor, marketed as Élan SC300 and Élan SC310, was the first in AMD's Élan series of SoCs.

== SC3xx family ==
The SC300 and SC310 combines a 32-bit, x86 compatible, low-voltage 25 MHz or 33 MHz Am386SX CPU with memory controller, PC/AT peripheral controllers, real-time clock, PLL clock generators and ISA bus interface. SC300 integrates in addition two PCMCIA 2.1 slots and a CGA-compatible LCD controller. Power consumption at 33 MHz was only 600 mW including CPU, memory controller and peripherals. In suspend mode consumption reduces to 0,17 mW. The low budget 9,7" laptop Brother GeoBook NB60 uses a SC300

== SC4xx family ==
The SC400 and SC410 combines a 32-bit, x86 compatible, low-voltage 33 MHz, 66 MHz or 100 MHz Am486 CPU with memory controller, PC/AT peripheral controllers, real-time clock, PLL clock generators, VESA Local Bus and ISA bus interface. SC400 integrates in addition two PCMCIA 2.1 slots and a 4-bit color Super-twisted nematic display (STN) LCD controller. The C64 "Web.it" Internet Computer uses a SC400 with 16 MB of RAM, a 3.5" floppy disk drive, 56k-modem and PCMCIA. The AirPort Base Station uses a SC410, the Nokia 9110 Communicator a SC450. AMD announced the SC400 on October 15, 1996.

== SC5xx family ==
The SC520 combines a 32-bit, x86 compatible, low-voltage 100 MHz or 133 MHz Am5x86 CPU with memory controller supporting SDRAM, PC/AT peripheral controllers, real-time clock and PCI bus. ISA and PCMCIA were no longer supported. AMD announced the SC520 on August 25, 1999.

== Comparison ==
Comparison
Name	Clock speed	FSB	L1 Cache	Architecture	Process technology	Package
SC300-25	25 MHz	25 MHz	–	Am386	700 nm (0.7 μm)	208-pin QFP; 208-pin TQFP
SC310-25	25 MHz	25 MHz	–	Am386	700 nm (0.7 μm)	208-pin QFP; 208-pin TQFP
SC300-33	33 MHz	33 MHz	–	Am386	700 nm (0.7 μm)	208-pin QFP; 208-pin TQFP
SC310-33	33 MHz	33 MHz	–	Am386	700 nm (0.7 μm)	208-pin QFP; 208-pin TQFP
SC400-33	33 MHz	33 MHz	8 kB	Am486	350 nm (0.35 μm)	292-pin BGA
SC410-33	33 MHz	33 MHz	8 kB	Am486	350 nm (0.35 μm)	292-pin BGA
SC450-33	33 MHz	33 MHz	8 kB	Am486	350 nm (0.35 μm)	292-pin BGA
SC400-66	66 MHz	33 MHz	8 kB	Am486	350 nm (0.35 μm)	292-pin BGA
SC410-66	66 MHz	33 MHz	8 kB	Am486	350 nm (0.35 μm)	292-pin BGA
SC400-100	100 MHz	33 MHz	8 kB	Am486	350 nm (0.35 μm)	292-pin BGA
SC410-100	100 MHz	33 MHz	8 kB	Am486	350 nm (0.35 μm)	292-pin BGA
SC520-100	100 MHz	33 MHz	16 kB	Am5x86	350 nm (0.35 μm)	388-pin PBGA
SC520-133	133 MHz	33 MHz	16 kB	Am5x86	350 nm (0.35 μm)	388-pin PBGA
