= Control operator =

Control operator may refer to:

- Operator (profession)
- Operators in control flow software programming

== See also ==
- Control (disambiguation)
- Operator (disambiguation)
