= Prefabrication =

Manufacturing of components before assembly

Prefabrication is the practice of assembling components of a structure in a factory or other manufacturing site, and transporting complete assemblies or sub-assemblies to the construction site where the structure is to be located. Some researchers refer it to "various materials joined together to form a component of the final installation procedure".

The most commonly cited definition is by Goodier and Gibb in 2007, which described the process of manufacturing and preassembly of a certain number of building components, modules, and elements before their shipment and installation on construction sites.

The term prefabrication also applies to the manufacturing of things other than structures at a fixed site. It is frequently used when fabrication of a section of a machine or any movable structure is shifted from the main manufacturing site to another location, and the section is supplied assembled and ready to fit. It is not generally used to refer to electrical or electronic components of a machine, or mechanical parts such as pumps, gearboxes and compressors which are usually supplied as separate items, but to sections of the body of the machine which in the past were fabricated with the whole machine. Prefabricated parts of the body of the machine may be called 'sub-assemblies' to distinguish them from the other components.

== Process and theory ==
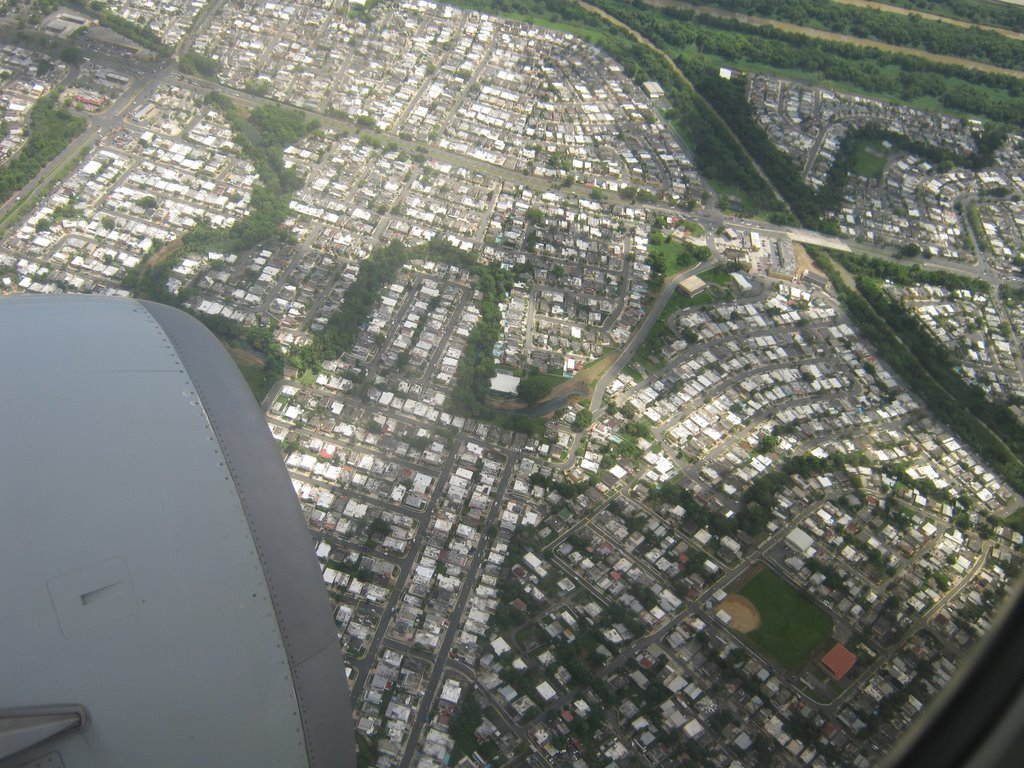
Levittown, Puerto Rico

An example from housebuilding illustrates the process of prefabrication. The conventional method of building a house is to transport bricks, timber, cement, sand, steel and construction aggregate, etc. to the site, and to construct the house on site from these materials. In prefabricated construction, only the foundations are constructed in this way, while sections of walls, floors and roof are prefabricated (assembled) in a factory (possibly with window and door frames included), transported to the site, lifted into place by a crane and bolted together.

Prefabrication is used in the manufacture of ships, aircraft and all kinds of vehicles and machines where sections previously assembled at the final point of manufacture are assembled elsewhere instead, before being delivered for final assembly.

The theory behind the method is that time and cost is saved if similar construction tasks can be grouped, and assembly line techniques can be employed in prefabrication at a location where skilled labour is available, while congestion at the assembly site, which wastes time, can be reduced. The method finds application particularly where the structure is composed of repeating units or forms, or where multiple copies of the same basic structure are being constructed. Prefabrication avoids the need to transport so many skilled workers to the construction site, and other restricting conditions such as a lack of power, lack of water, exposure to harsh weather or a hazardous environment are avoided. Against these advantages must be weighed the cost of transporting prefabricated sections and lifting them into position as they will usually be larger, more fragile and more difficult to handle than the materials and components of which they are made.

== History ==
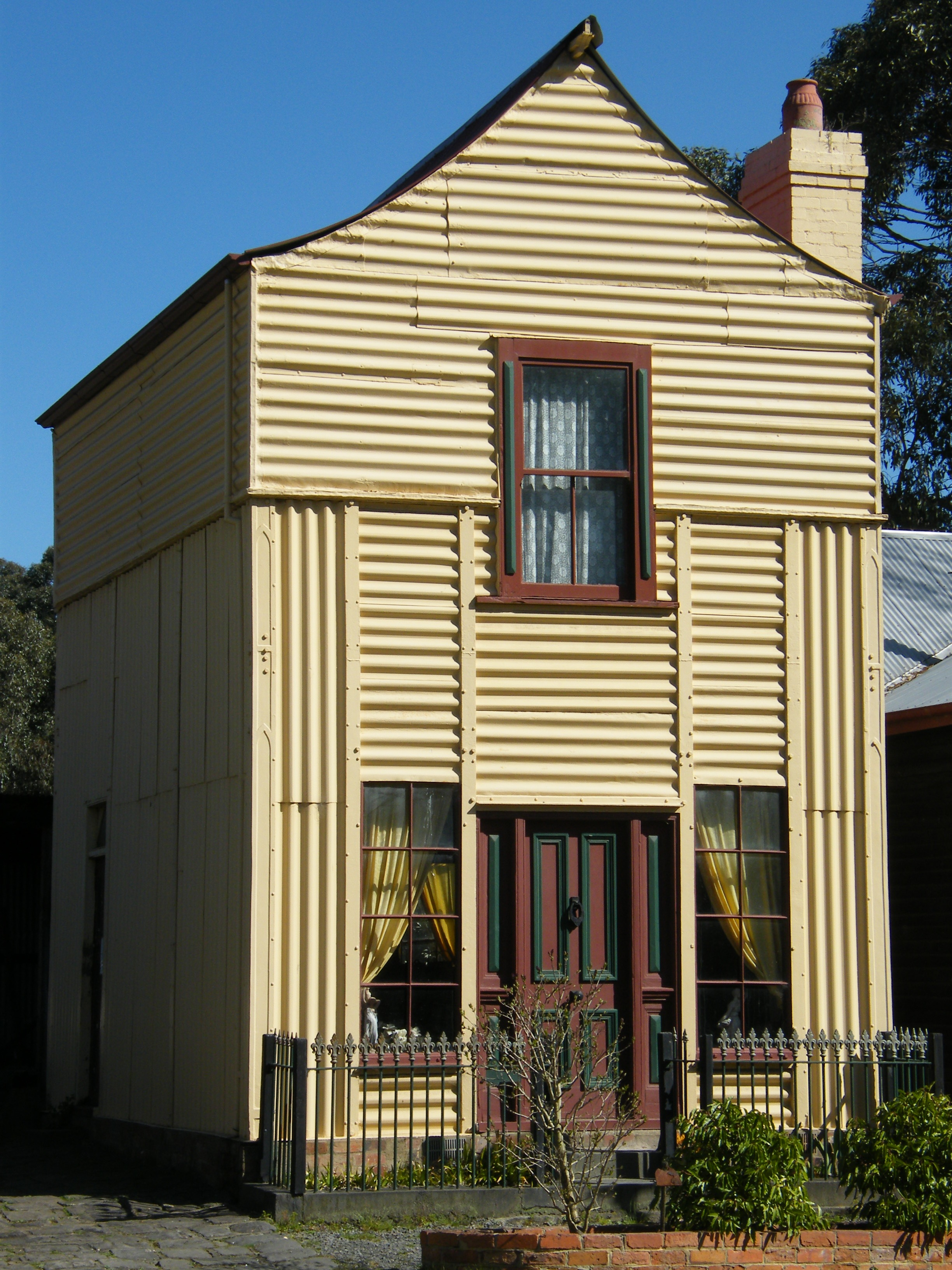
"Loren" Iron House, at Old Gippstown in Moe, Australia

Prefabrication has been used since ancient times. For example, it is claimed that the world's oldest known engineered roadway, the Sweet Track constructed in England around 3800 BC, employed prefabricated timber sections brought to the site rather than assembled on-site.

Sinhalese kings of ancient Sri Lanka have used prefabricated buildings technology to erect giant structures, which dates back as far as 2000 years, where some sections were prepared separately and then fitted together, specially in the Kingdom of Anuradhapura and Polonnaruwa.

After the great Lisbon earthquake of 1755, the Portuguese capital, especially the Baixa district, was rebuilt by using prefabrication on an unprecedented scale. Under the guidance of Sebastião José de Carvalho e Melo, popularly known as the Marquis de Pombal, the most powerful royal minister of D. Jose I, a new Pombaline style of architecture and urban planning arose, which introduced early anti-seismic design features and innovative prefabricated construction methods, according to which large multistory buildings were entirely manufactured outside the city, transported in pieces and then assembled on site. The process, which lasted into the nineteenth century, lodged the city's residents in safe new structures unheard-of before the quake.

Also in Portugal, the town of Vila Real de Santo António in the Algarve, founded on 30 December 1773, was quickly erected through the use of prefabricated materials en masse. The first of the prefabricated stones was laid in March 1774. By 13 May 1776, the centre of the town had been finished and was officially opened.

In 19th century Australia a large number of prefabricated houses were imported from the United Kingdom.

The method was widely used in the construction of prefabricated housing in the 20th century, such as in the United Kingdom as temporary housing for thousands of urban families "bombed out" during World War II. Assembling sections in factories saved time on-site and the lightness of the panels reduced the cost of foundations and assembly on site. Coloured concrete grey and with flat roofs, prefab houses were uninsulated and cold and life in a prefab acquired a certain stigma, but some London prefabs were occupied for much longer than the projected 10 years.

The Crystal Palace, erected in London in 1851, was a highly visible example of iron and glass prefabricated construction; it was followed on a smaller scale by Oxford Rewley Road railway station.

During World War II, prefabricated Cargo ships, designed to quickly replace ships sunk by Nazi U-boats became increasingly common. The most ubiquitous of these ships was the American Liberty ship, which reached production of over 2,000 units, averaging 3 per day.

== Current uses ==
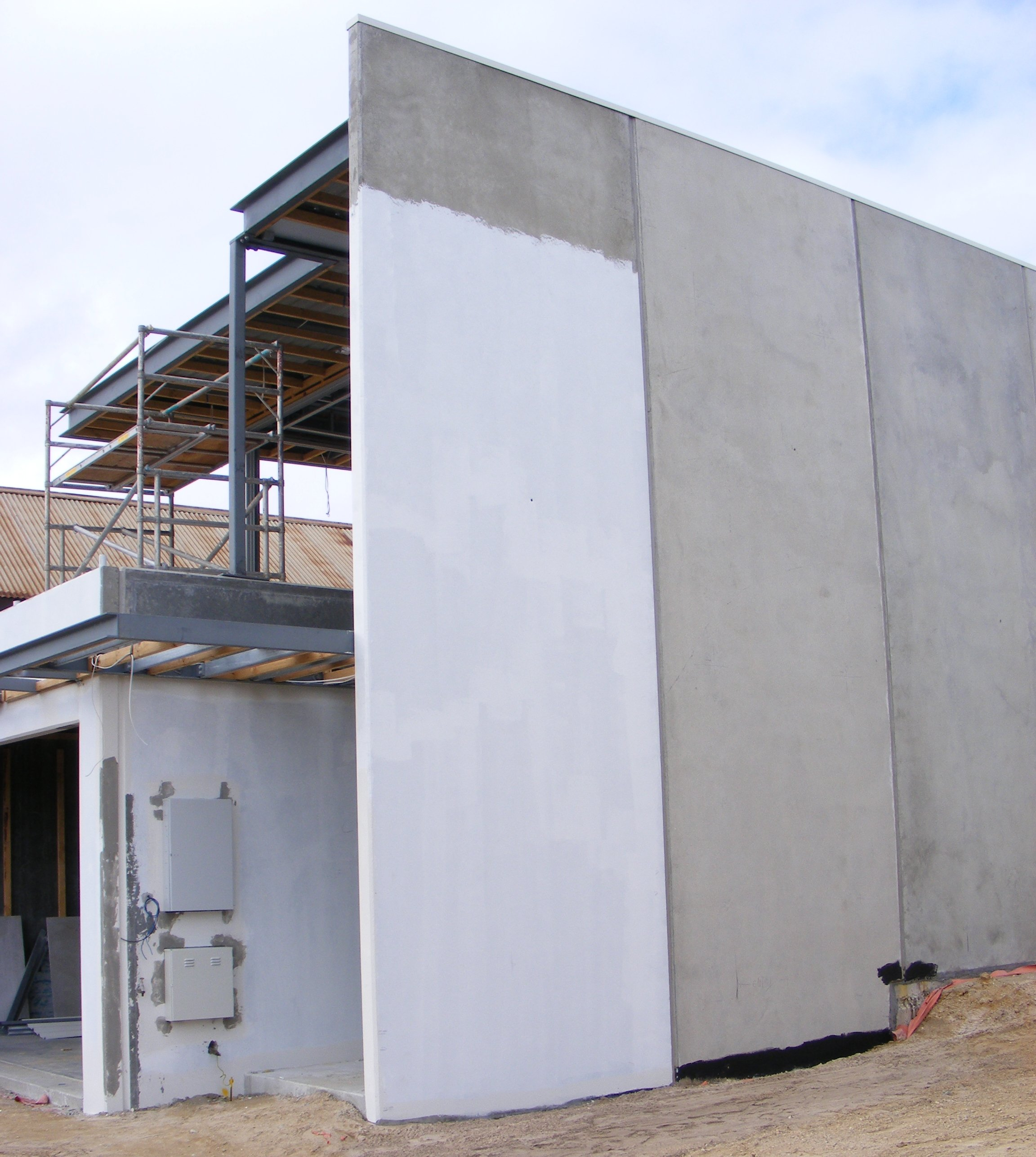
A house being built with prefabricated concrete panels.

The most widely used form of prefabrication in building and civil engineering is the use of prefabricated concrete and prefabricated steel sections in structures where a particular part or form is repeated many times. It can be difficult to construct the formwork required to mould concrete components on site, and delivering wet concrete to the site before it starts to set requires precise time management. Pouring concrete sections in a factory brings the advantages of being able to re-use moulds and the concrete can be mixed on the spot without having to be transported to and pumped wet on a congested construction site. Prefabricating steel sections reduces on-site cutting and welding costs as well as the associated hazards.

Prefabrication techniques are used in the construction of apartment blocks, and housing developments with repeated housing units. Prefabrication is an essential part of the industrialization of construction. The quality of prefabricated housing units had increased to the point that they may not be distinguishable from traditionally built units to those that live in them. The technique is also used in office blocks, warehouses and factory buildings. Prefabricated steel and glass sections are widely used for the exterior of large buildings.

Detached houses, cottages, log cabin, saunas, etc. are also sold with prefabricated elements. Prefabrication of modular wall elements allows building of complex thermal insulation, window frame components, etc. on an assembly line, which tends to improve quality over on-site construction of each individual wall or frame. Wood construction in particular benefits from the improved quality. However, tradition often favors building by hand in many countries, and the image of prefab as a "cheap" method only slows its adoption. However, current practice already allows the modifying the floor plan according to the customer's requirements and selecting the surfacing material, e.g. a personalized brick facade can be masoned even if the load-supporting elements are timber.

Today, prefabrication is used in various industries and construction sectors such as healthcare, retail, hospitality, education, and public administration, due to its many advantages and benefits over traditional on-site construction, such as reduced installation time and cost savings. Being used in single-story buildings as well as in multi-story projects and constructions. Providing the possibility of applying it to a specific part of the project or to the whole of it.

The efficiency and speed in the execution times of these works offer that, for example, in the case of the educational sector, it is possible to execute the projects without the cessation of the operations of the educational facilities during the development of the same.

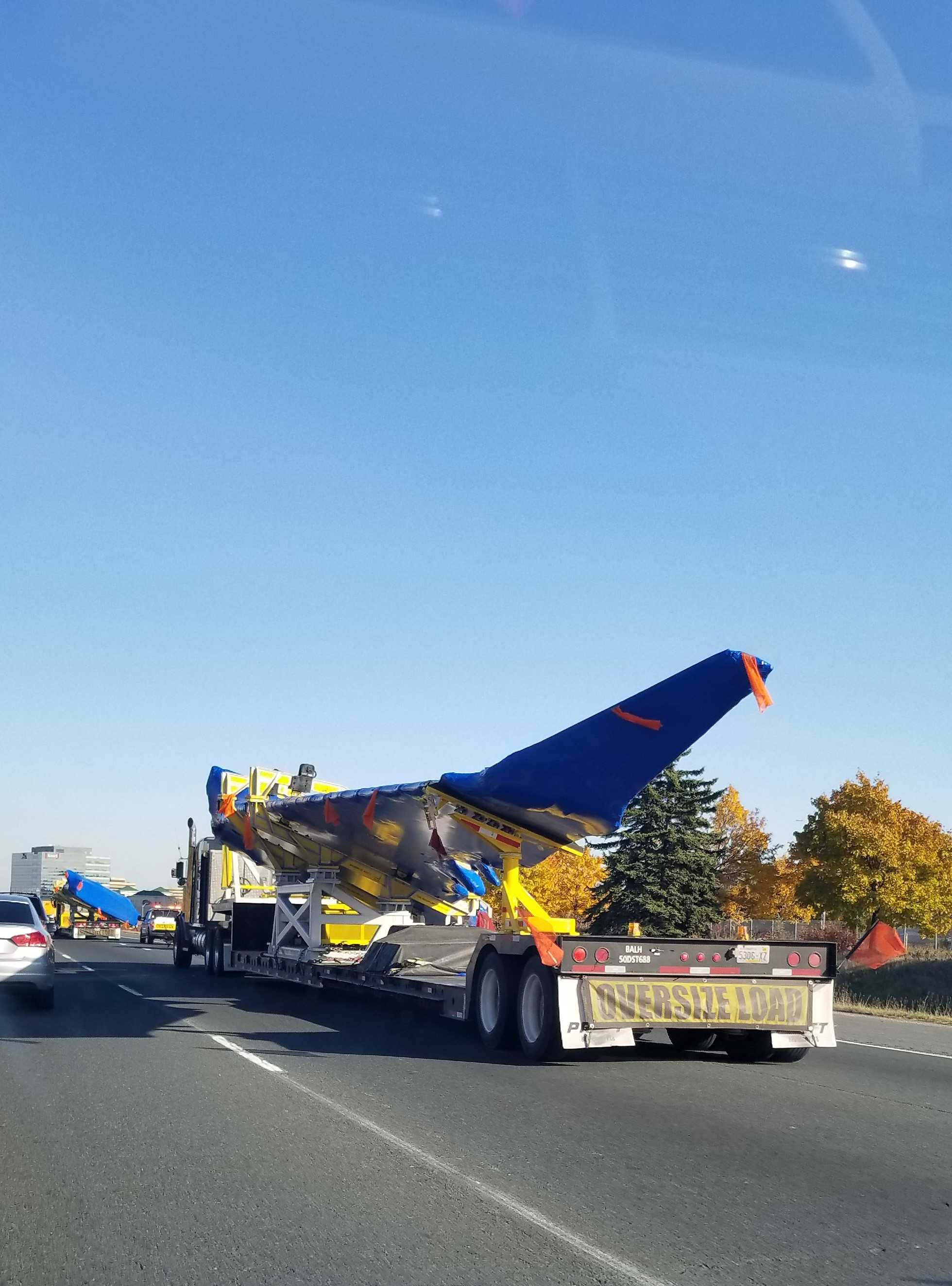
Transportation of prefabricated Airbus wing assembly

Prefabrication saves engineering time on the construction site in civil engineering projects. This can be vital to the success of projects such as bridges and avalanche galleries, where weather conditions may only allow brief periods of construction. Prefabricated bridge elements and systems offer bridge designers and contractors significant advantages in terms of construction time, safety, environmental impact, constructibility, and cost. Prefabrication can also help minimize the impact on traffic from bridge building. Additionally, small, commonly used structures such as concrete pylons are in most cases prefabricated.

Radio towers for mobile phone and other services often consist of multiple prefabricated sections. Modern lattice towers and guyed masts are also commonly assembled of prefabricated elements.

Prefabrication has become widely used in the assembly of aircraft and spacecraft, with components such as wings and fuselage sections often being manufactured in different countries or states from the final assembly site. However, this is sometimes for political rather than commercial reasons, such as for Airbus.

== Advantages ==
- Moving partial assemblies from a factory often costs less than moving pre-production resources to each site
- Deploying resources on-site can add costs; prefabricating assemblies can save costs by reducing on-site work
- Factory tools - jigs, cranes, conveyors, etc. - can make production faster and more precise
- Factory tools - shake tables, hydraulic testers, etc. - can offer added quality assurance
- Consistent indoor environments of factories eliminate most impacts of weather on production
- Cranes and reusable factory supports can allow shapes and sequences without expensive on-site falsework
- Higher-precision factory tools can aid more controlled movement of building heat and air, for lower energy consumption and healthier buildings
- Factory production can facilitate more efficient materials usage, recycling, noise capture, dust capture, etc.
- Machine-mediated parts movement, and freedom from wind and rain can improve construction safety
- Homogeneous manufacturing allows high standardization and quality control, ensuring quality requirements subject to performance and resistance tests, which also facilitate high scalability of construction projects.
- The specific production processes in industrial assembly lines allow high sustainability, which enables savings of up to 20% of the total final cost, as well as considerable savings in indirect costs.

== Disadvantages ==
- Transportation costs may be higher for voluminous prefabricated sections (especially sections so big that they constitute oversize loads requiring special signage, escort vehicles, and temporary road closures) than for their constituent materials, which can often be packed more densely and are more likely to fit onto standard-sized vehicles.
- Large prefabricated sections may require heavy-duty cranes and precision measurement and handling to place in position.

== Off-site fabrication ==
Off-site fabrication is a process that incorporates prefabrication and pre-assembly. The process involves the design and manufacture of units or modules, usually remote from the work site, and the installation at the site to form the permanent works at the site. In its fullest sense, off-site fabrication requires a project strategy that will change the orientation of the project process from construction to manufacture to installation. Examples of off-site fabrication are wall panels for homes, wooden truss bridge spans, airport control stations.

There are four main categories of off-site fabrication, which is often also referred to as off-site construction. These can be described as component (or sub-assembly) systems, panelised systems, volumetric systems, and modular systems. Below these categories different branches, or technologies are being developed. There are a vast number of different systems on the market which fall into these categories and with recent advances in digital design such as building information modeling (BIM), the task of integrating these different systems into a construction project is becoming increasingly a "digital" management proposition.

The prefabricated construction market is booming. It is growing at an accelerated pace both in more established markets such as North America and Europe and in emerging economies such as the Asia-Pacific region (mainly China and India). Considerable growth is expected in the coming years, with the prefabricated modular construction market expected to grow at a CAGR (compound annual growth rate) of 8% between 2022 and 2030. It is expected to reach US$271 billion by 2030.

== See also ==
- Prefabricated home
- Prefabricated buildings
- Concrete perpend
- Panelák
- Tower block
- St Crispin's School — an example of a prefabricated school building
- Nonsuch House, first prefabricated building
- Agile construction
- Intermediate good
