= Control unit (disambiguation) =

A control unit (CU) is a central, sometimes distributed but clearly distinguishable, part of a mechanism that controls its operation, for example in a computer or a motor vehicle.

Control unit may refer to:

- Control unit, a component of a computer's central processing unit
- Control unit, a special area of a prison that is used to keep prisoners in solitary confinement (also called a "segregation unit")
- Another name for a Controller in computing
- Multipoint control unit, a device commonly used to bridge videoconferencing connections
- Packet control unit, performs some of the processing tasks of a base station subsystem
- Premises control unit, the "brain" of a burglar alarm
- Telecommunication control unit, a device attached to a computer multiplexer channel which supports multiple terminals
- Camera control unit, typically part of a live television broadcast "chain"
- Electronic control unit, an embedded system that controls electrical systems in a motor vehicle
  - Engine control unit, an electronic control unit that controls a series of actuators on an internal combustion engine
  - Fuel control unit, a control system for gas turbine engines
  - Transmission control unit, a device that controls electronic automatic transmissions, and automated clutch systems, such as servos or actuators, in a clutchless manual or semi-automatic transmission
- Control car (rail), a non-powered railroad vehicle that can control the operation of a train
- Actuator control unit, a control unit for actuators used in the internet of things

== See also ==
- Control (disambiguation)
- Controller (disambiguation)
