= Controller (computing) =

In computer hardware, a controller may refer to:

- Memory controller, a unit that manages access to memory
- Charge controller
- Game controller, a device by which the user controls the operation of the computer
- Host controller
- Sound controller
- Network controller
- Graphics controller or video display controller
- SCSI host bus adapter
- Parallel port controller
- Microcontroller unit (MCU)
- Keyboard controller
- Programmable interrupt controller
- Power management controller
- Northbridge (computing)
- Southbridge (computing)
- Universal asynchronous receiver/transmitter (UART) communications controller chip
- Peripheral DMA controller
- Disk controller
- Floppy disk controller
- Disk array controller, also known as a RAID controller, a type of storage controller
- Flash controller, or SSD controller, which manages flash memory
- Storage controller
- Terminal access controller
- IBM 2821 Control Unit, used to attach card readers, punches and line printers to IBM System/360 and IBM System/370 computers
- IBM 270x and IBM 37xx, used for telecommunications
- IBM 3271, 3272, 3271, and 3174, used to attach terminals (display devices)
- MIDI controller
- Programmable logic controller
