= Am486 =

80486-class computer processor family by AMD

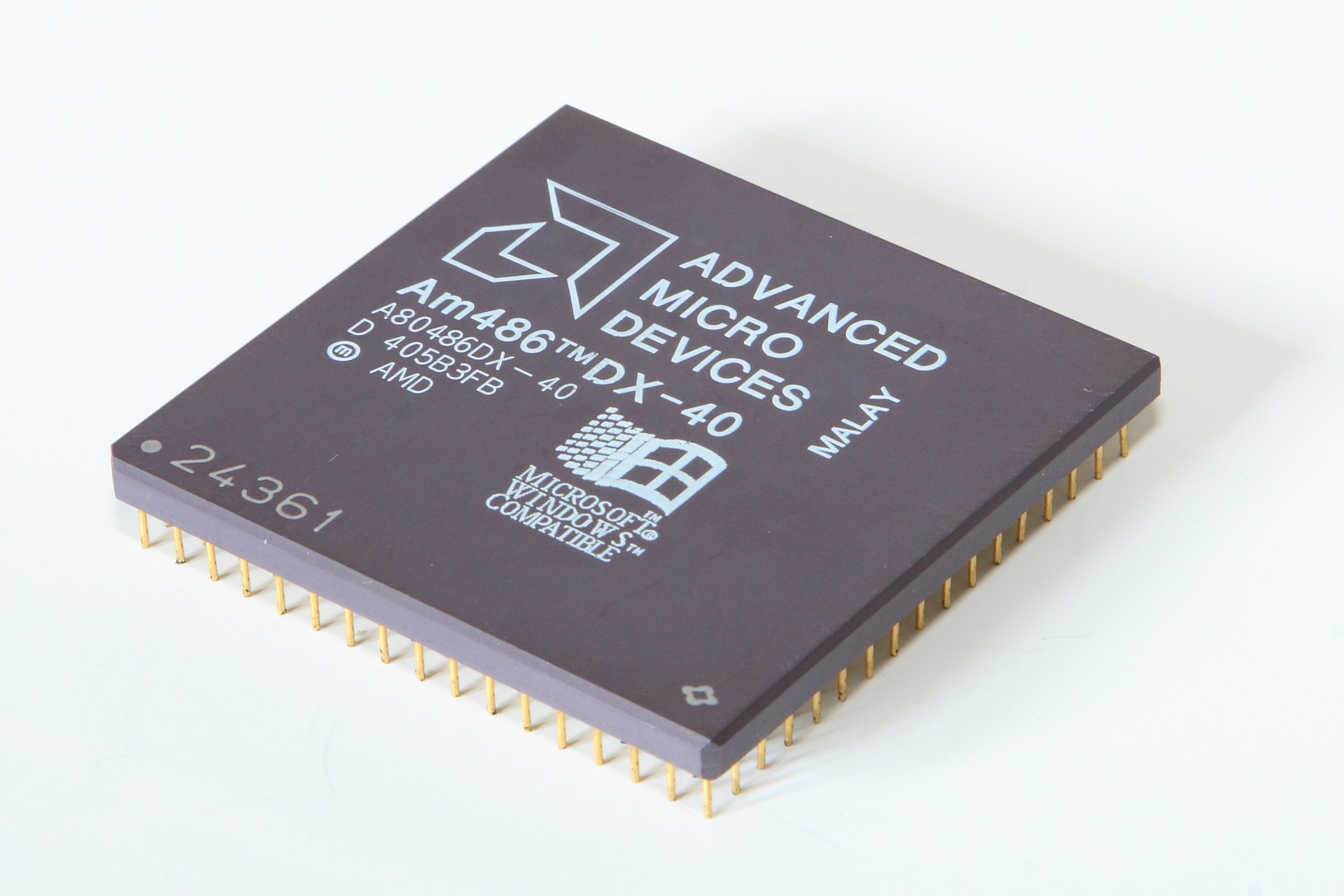
AMD Am486DX 40 MHz

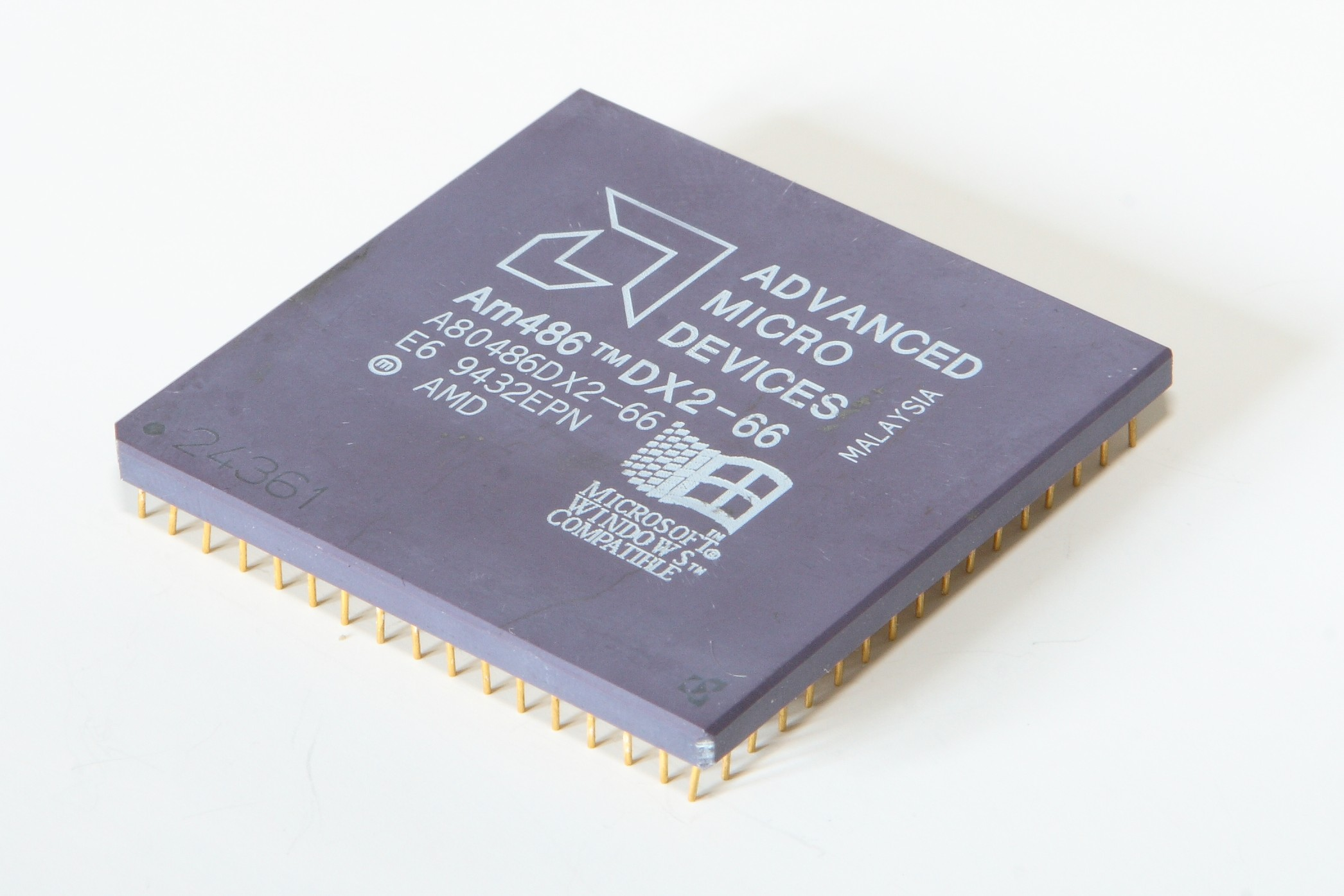
AMD Am486DX2 66MHz

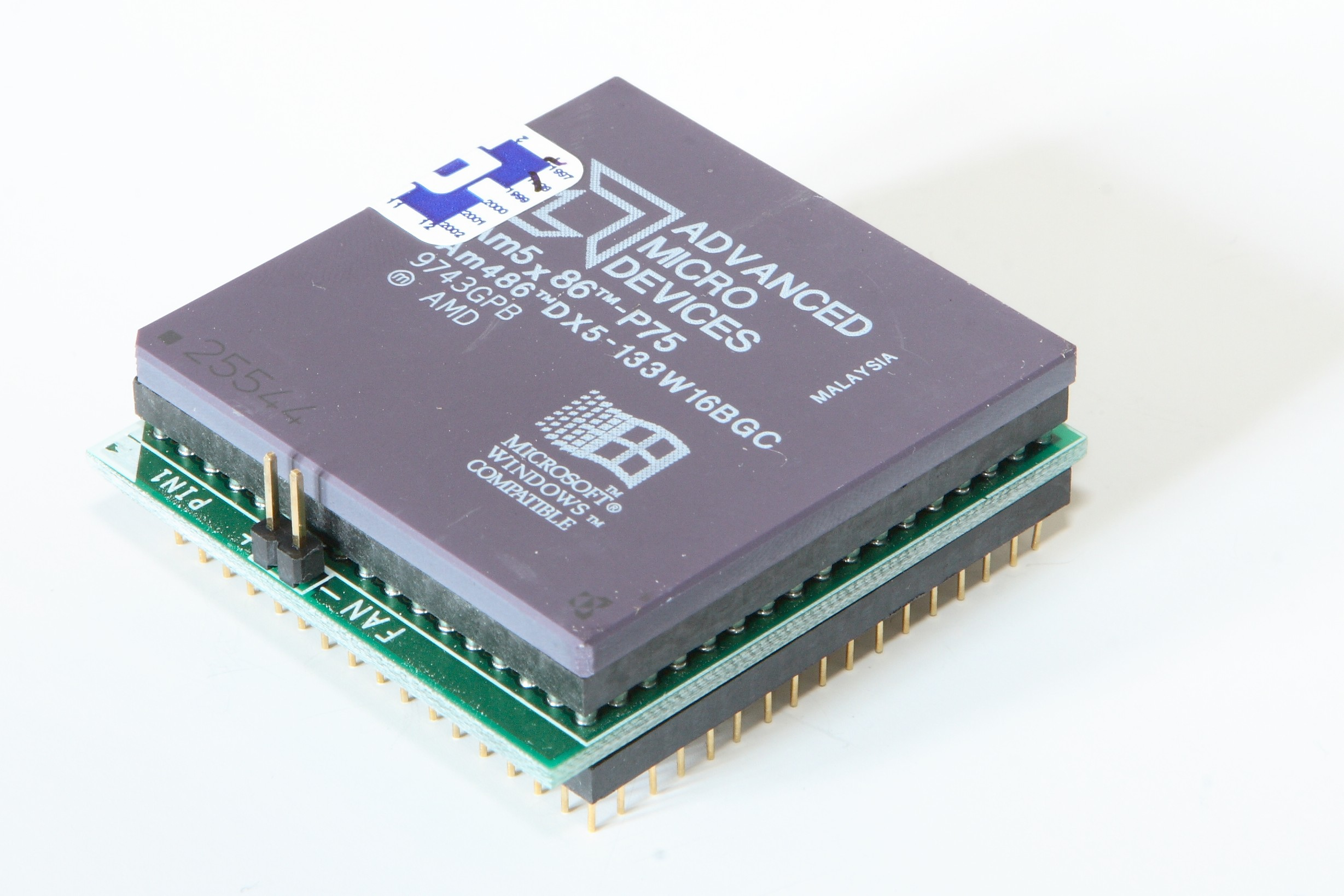
AMD Am5x86-P75

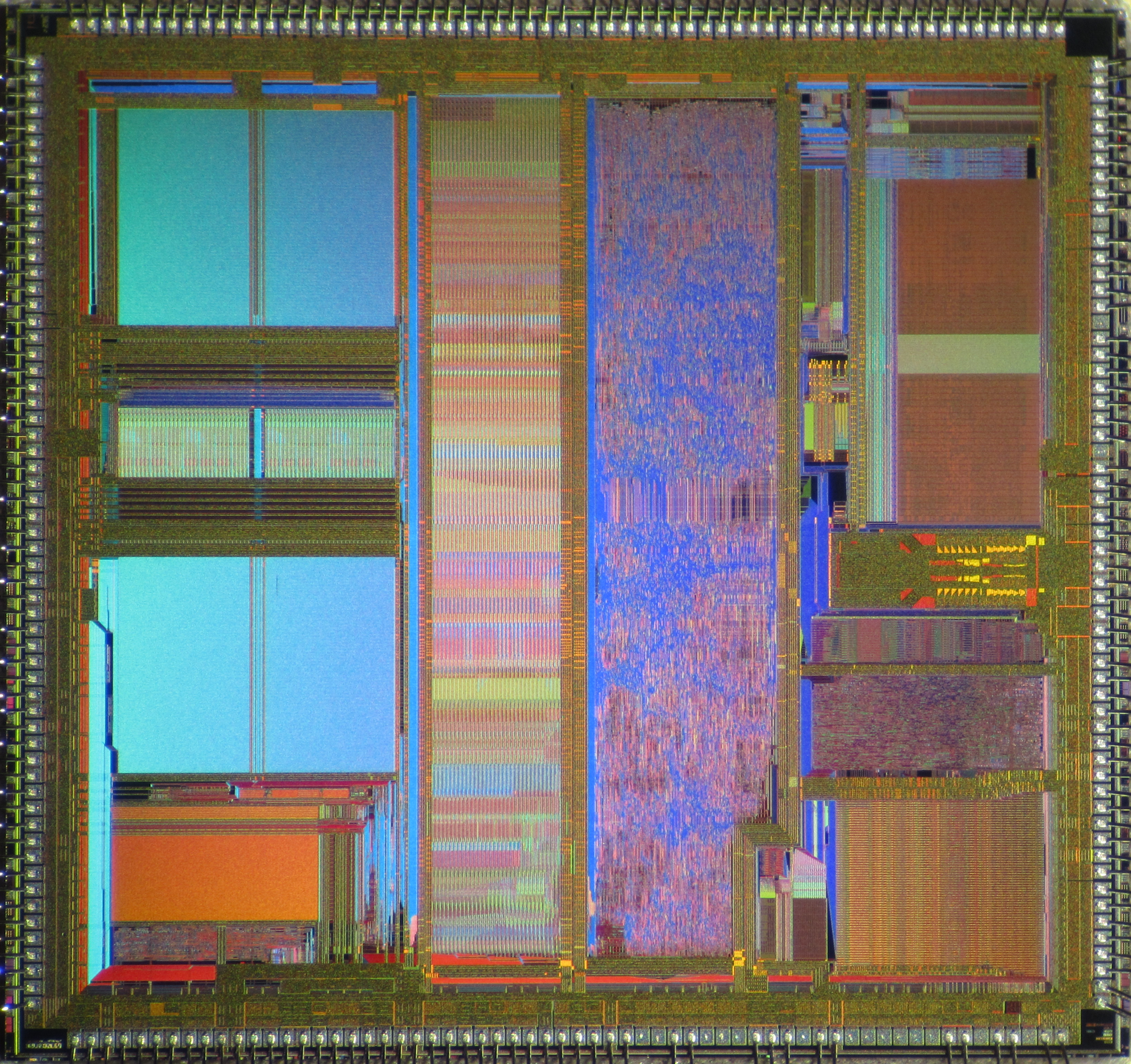
AMD Am486 DX2-66 die shot

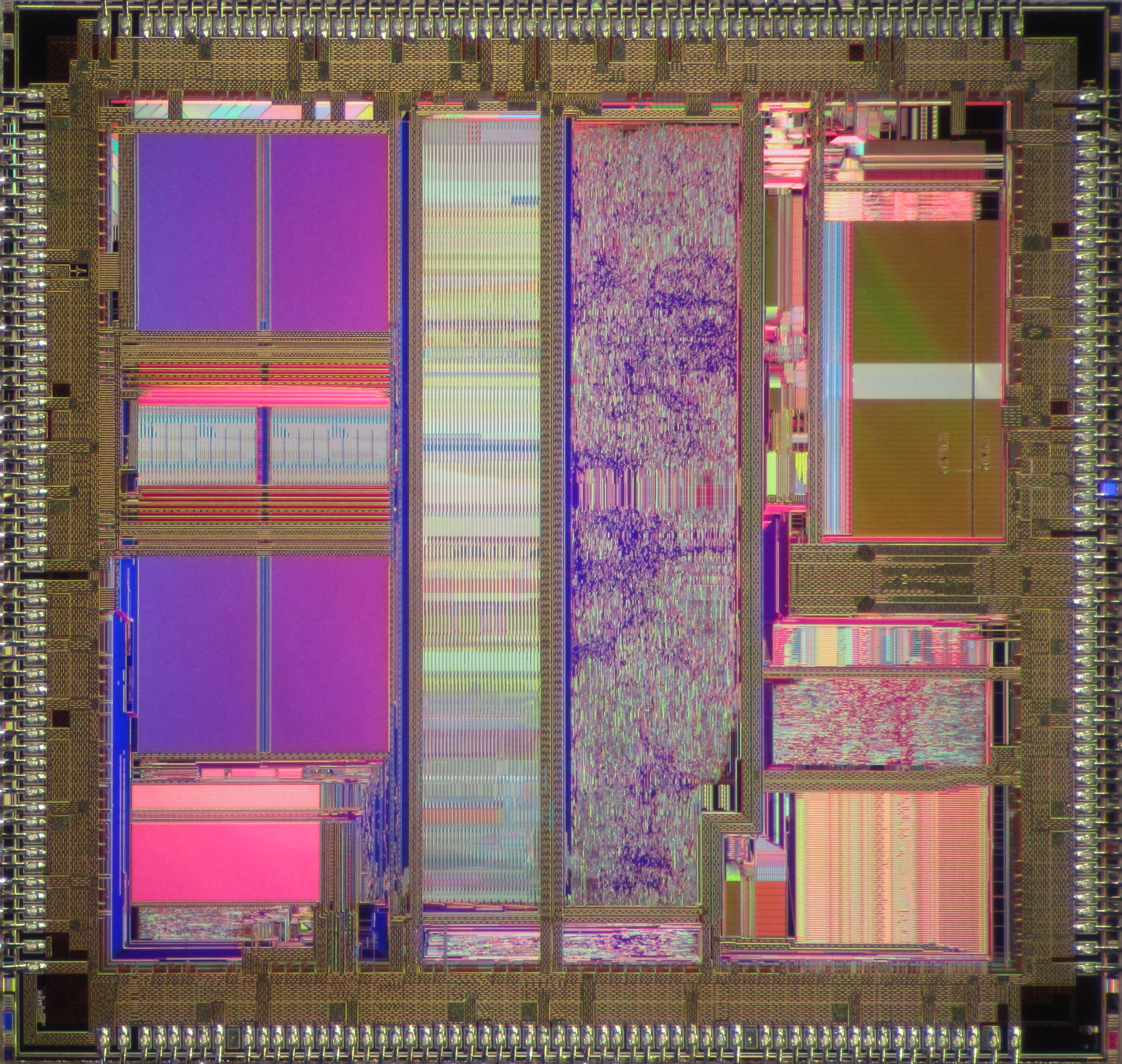
AMD Enhanced Am486 DX4-120 die shot

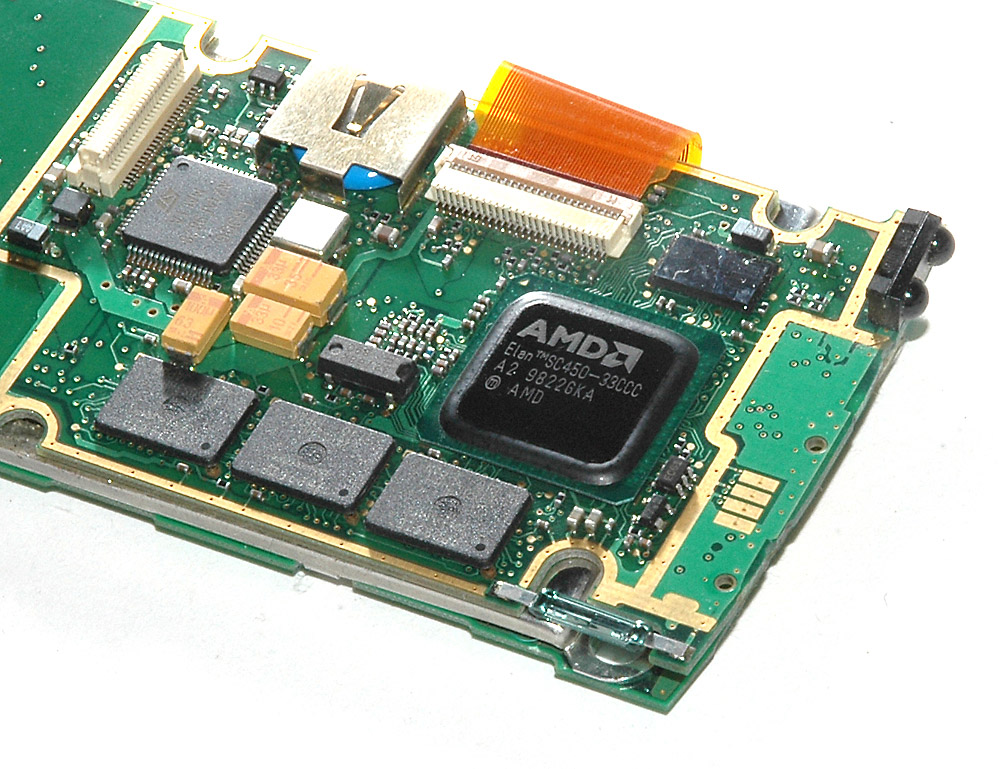
AMD Élan SC450 in Nokia 9110 Communicator

The Am486 is a 80486-class family of computer processors that was produced by AMD in the 1990s. Intel beat AMD to market by nearly four years, but AMD priced its 40 MHz 486 at or below Intel's price for a 33 MHz chip, offering about 20% better performance for the same price.

While competing 486 chips, such as those from Cyrix, benchmarked lower than the equivalent Intel chip, AMD's 486 matched Intel's performance on a clock-for-clock basis.

While the Am386 was primarily used by small computer manufacturers, the Am486DX, DX2, and SX2 chips gained acceptance among larger computer manufacturers, especially Acer and Compaq, in the 1994 time frame.

AMD's higher clocked 486 chips provided superior integer performance to many of the early Pentium chips, especially the 60 and 66 MHz launch products. While equivalent Intel 80486DX4 chips were priced high and required a minor socket modification, AMD priced low. Intel's DX4 chips initially had twice the cache of the AMD chips, giving them a slight performance edge, but AMD's DX4-100 usually cost less than Intel's DX2-66.

The enhanced Am486 series supported new features like extended power-saving modes and an 8 KiB Write-Back L1-Cache, later versions even got an upgrade to 16 KiB Write-Back L1-Cache.

The 133 MHz AMD Am5x86 was a higher clocked enhanced Am486.

One derivative of the Am486 family is the core used in the AMD Élan SC4xx family of microcontrollers marketed by AMD.

== Am486 models ==
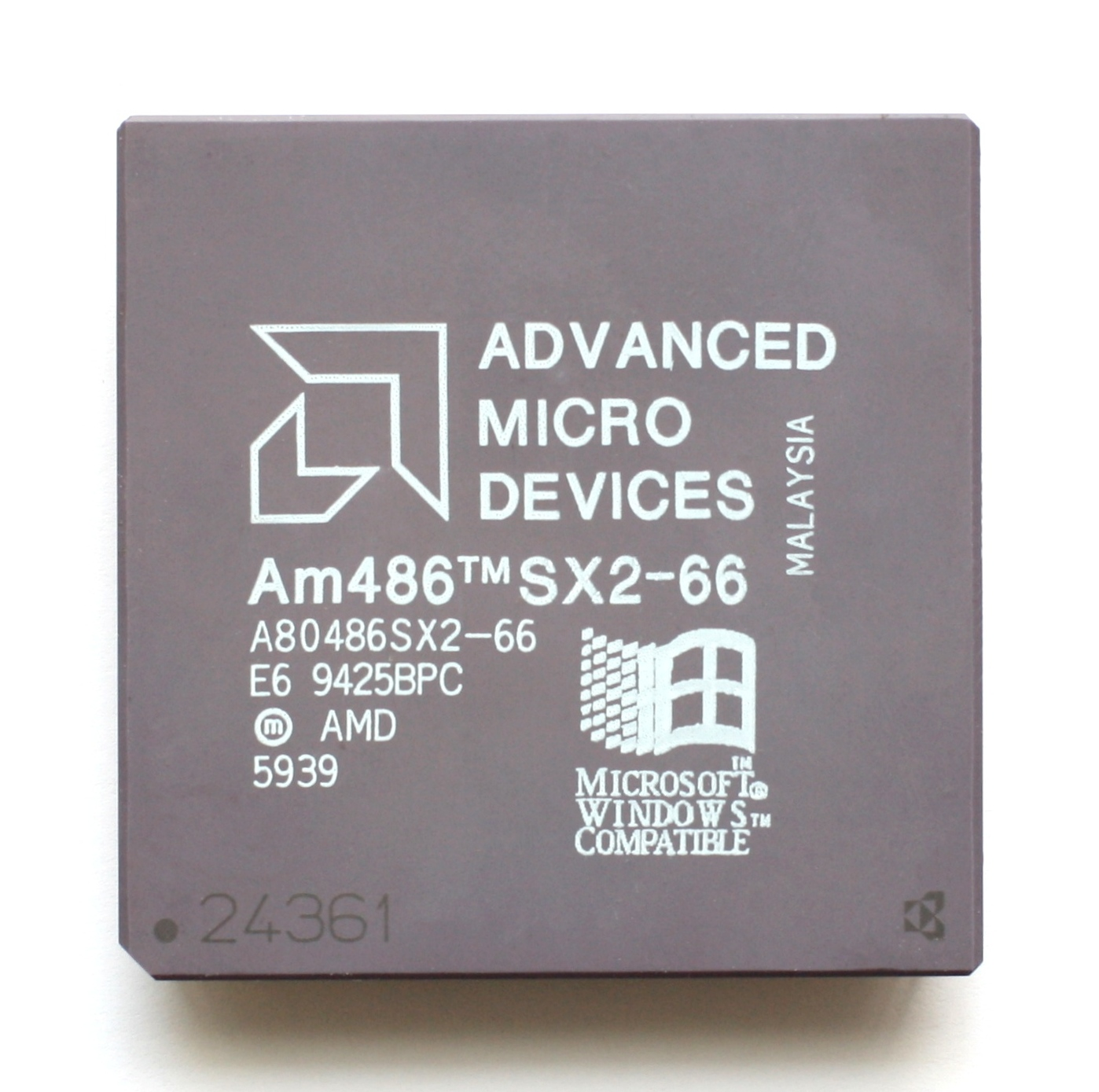
Am486SX2-66.

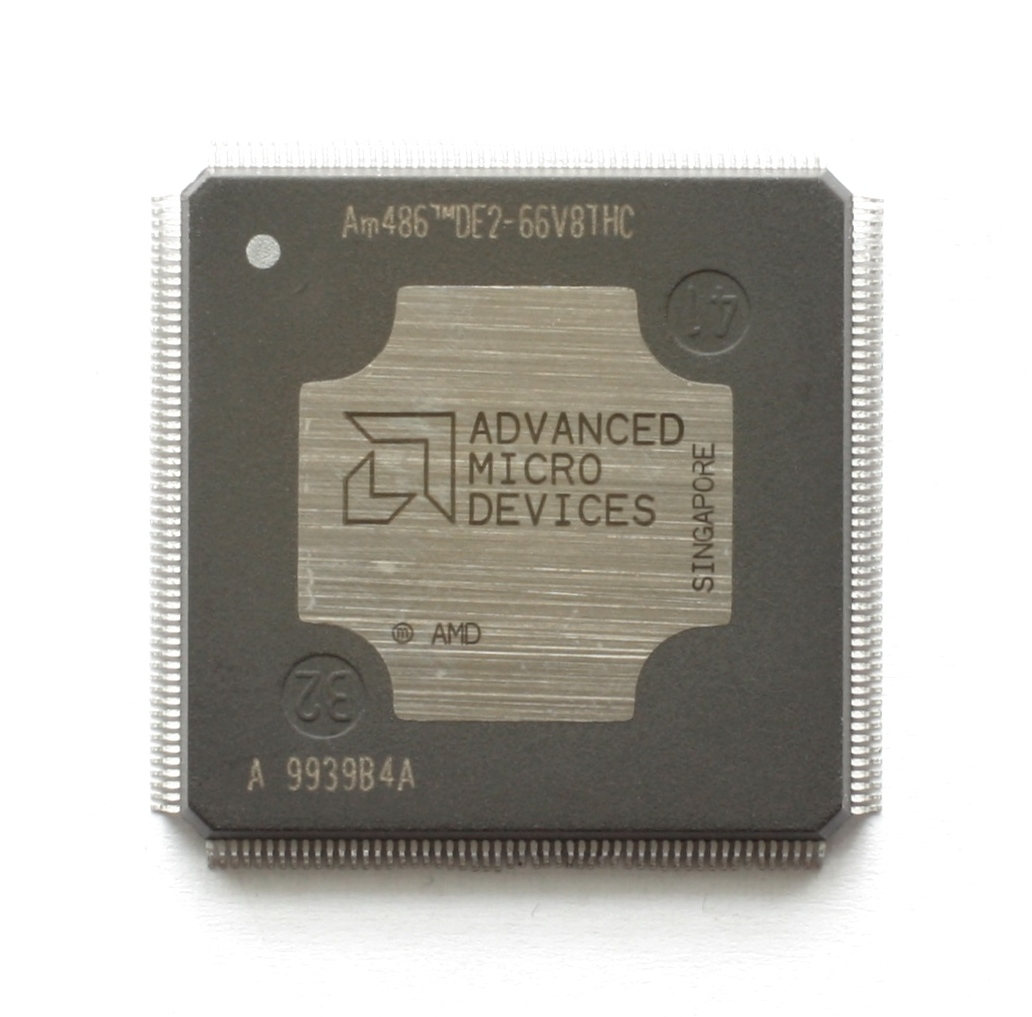
Am486DE2-66 with power management for embedded systems.

Model	FSB	Clock speed	VCore	L1-Cache	Introduced
Am486 DX-25	25 MHz		5 V	8 KiB WT	
Am486 DX-33	33 MHz		5 V	8 KiB WT	
Am486 DX-40	40 MHz		5 V	8 KiB WT	Apr 1993
Am486 SX-33	33 MHz		5 V	8 KiB WT	
Am486 SX-40	40 MHz		5 V	8 KiB WT	
Am486 DE2-66	33 MHz	66 MHz	3.3 V	8 KiB WT	1996(?)
Am486 DX2-50	25 MHz	50 MHz	5 V	8 KiB WT	Apr 1993
Am486 DX2-66	33 MHz	66 MHz	5/3.3 V	8 KiB WT	Sep 1994
Am486 DX2-80	40 MHz	80 MHz	5/3.3 V	8 KiB WT	Sep 1994
Am486 SX2-50	25 MHz	50 MHz	5 V	8 KiB WT	
Am486 SX2-66	33 MHz	66 MHz	5 V	8 KiB WT	Apr 1994
Am486 DX4-75	25 MHz	75 MHz	3.3 V	8 KiB WT	
Am486 DX4-90	30 MHz	90 MHz	3.3 V	8 KiB WT	
Am486 DX4-100	33 MHz	100 MHz	3.3 V	8 KiB WT	1995
Am486 DX4-120	40 MHz	120 MHz	3.3 V	8 KiB WT	
Enhanced Am486 DX2-66	33 MHz	66 MHz	3.3/3.45 V	8/16 KiB WB	
Enhanced Am486 DX2-80	40 MHz	80 MHz	3.3/3.45 V	8 KiB WB	
Enhanced Am486 DX4-75	25 MHz	75 MHz	3.3/3.45 V	8 KiB WB	
Enhanced Am486 DX4-100	33 MHz	100 MHz	3.3/3.45 V	8/16 KiB WB	
Enhanced Am486 DX4-120	40 MHz	120 MHz	3.3/3.45 V	8/16 KiB WB	

WT = Write-Through cache strategy, WB = Write-Back cache strategy
