= Controller =

Controller may refer to:

== Occupations ==
- Controller or financial controller, or in government accounting comptroller, a senior accounting position
- Controller, someone who performs agent handling in espionage
- Air traffic controller, a person who directs aircraft

== Computing and electronics ==
- Model–view–controller, an architectural pattern used in software engineering
- Controller (computing)
- Microcontroller, a small computer on a single integrated circuit
- Game controller, an input device used for playing video games
- Remote controller

== Control engineering ==
- Control theory, control of continuously operating dynamical systems in engineered processes and machines
  - Irrigation controller, a device to automate irrigation systems
  - PID controller, a control loop feedback mechanism
- Control loop, contains all the control elements for controlling a process variable
  - Anti-lock brake controller, in an anti-lock braking system
- Industrial control system, a general term used in industrial process control
- Proportional control, a type of linear feedback control system

== Biomedical ==
- Elite controllers, individuals who do not develop AIDS after exposure to HIV

== Fiction ==
- Controller (comics), multiple characters
  - Controller (Marvel Comics), a fictional character in Marvel Comics
  - Controllers (DC Comics), a fictional extraterrestrial race in the DC Universe
- The Fat Controller (Sir Topham Hatt), the head of the railway in The Railway Series of books written by the Reverend W.V. Awdry, also The Thin Controller and The Small Controller on other railway lines in those books
- Controller, a being controlled by a Yeerk in the Animorphs series by K.A. Applegate
- The Controller, an AI system in the Armored Core 3 video game

== Music ==
- The Controllers (Los Angeles band), a punk rock band
- The Controllers (R&B band), a 1980s rhythm-and-blues band
- Controller (Misery Signals album), 2008
- Controller (British India album), 2013
- "Controller" (song), a 2017 song by New Zealand L.A.B.
- MIDI controller, a device which generates MIDI data
- Nick Rhodes (born 1962), English keyboardist and producer
- "Controller", a song from the 1981 album Only a Lad by the new-wave band Oingo Boingo
- "Controllah", a song from the deluxe edition of the 2023 album Cracker Island by Gorillaz

== See also ==
- Control (disambiguation)
- Control unit (disambiguation)
- Comptroller general (disambiguation)
- "Controlla", 2016 single by Drake
