= Controller (comics) =

Controller, in comics, may refer to:

- Controller (Marvel Comics), a supervillain in Marvel Comics
- Controllers (DC Comics), an alien race in DC Comics

== See also ==
- Controller (disambiguation)
