= Terminal access controller =

A terminal access controller (TAC) is a host computer that accepts terminal connections, usually from dial-up lines, and that allows the user to invoke Internet remote log-on procedures, such as Telnet.
