= Storage controller =

A storage controller, is a digital circuit that manages the flow of data going to and from a computer storage device. The term "storage controller" may refer to either the storage interface controller on CPU or chipset, the flash memory controller on solid state drive, or the disk controller on hard disk drive.

== History ==
In history, the storage interface controller is usually integrated in southbridge. AMD Zen 1 architecture (2017) and Intel Rocket Lake architecture (2021) had integrated the M.2 storage interface controller in CPU.

== Variants ==
=== Floppy disk controller ===
In 1990s PCs, the floppy disk controller is usually integrated in super I/O chip.

=== IDE controller ===
In older PCs, the IDE controller is usually integrated in southbridge.

=== SCSI controller ===
In older workstations and servers used as a high-end alternative to consumer-grade IDE hard disk drives. Gave way to Serial Attached SCSI (SAS).

=== AHCI controller ===
The AHCI controller is usually integrated in southbridge.

=== M.2 controller ===
The M.2 controller is usually integrated in SoC, CPU, or southbridge.

=== RAID controller ===
The RAID controller is usually found on more advanced computers such as servers.

== See also ==
- Computer data storage
- Memory controller
