= Control point =

Control point may refer to:

- Control point (mathematics)
- Control point (orienteering)
- Control point (rail)
- Control points (video games)
- Counting point (logistics)
- Geodetic control point
- Port of entry
- Border checkpoint
- Kilometre zero or mile zero, a point from which road distances are measured

== See also ==
- Control (disambiguation)
- Control station (disambiguation)
- Point (disambiguation)
