= Am386 =

AMD microprocessor clone

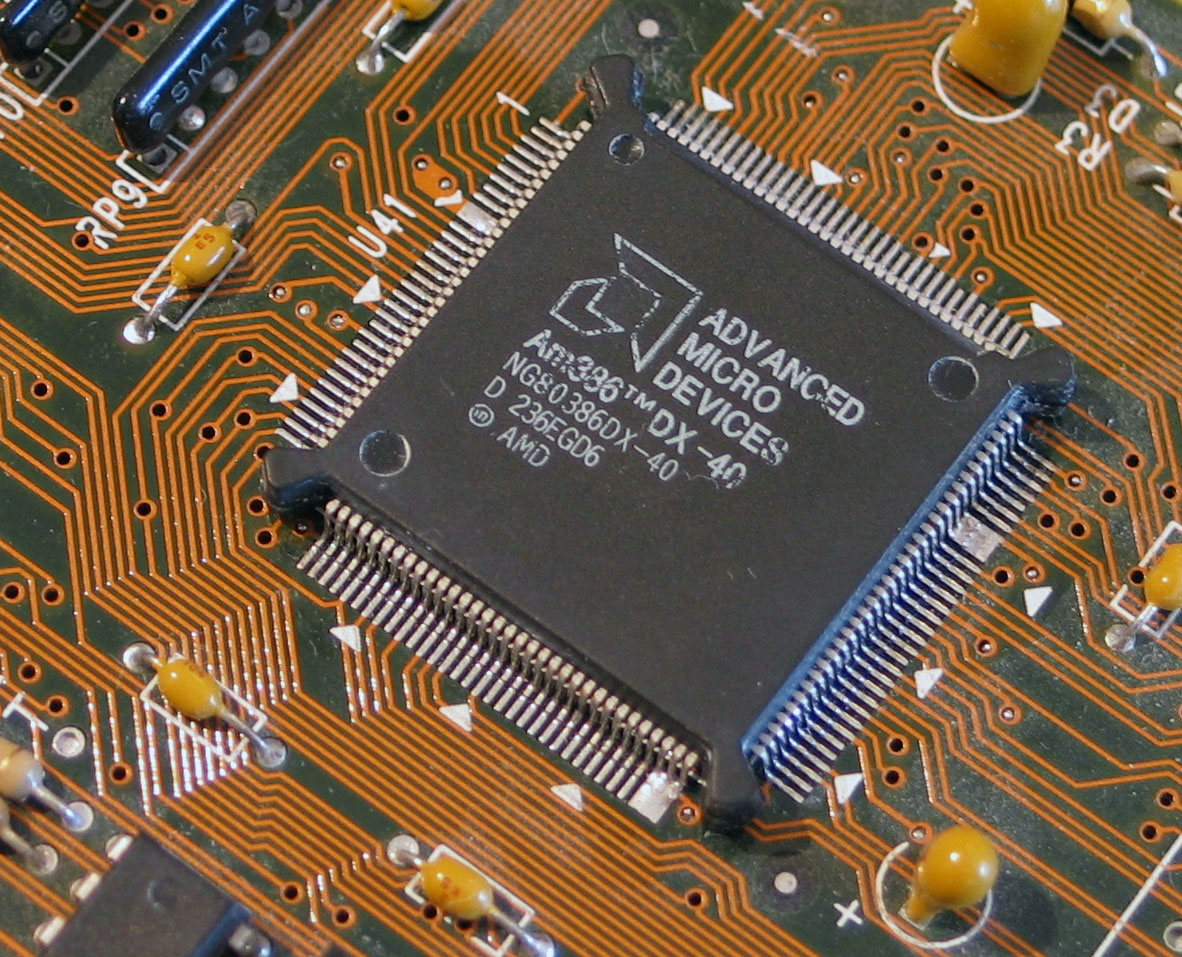
- An AMD 80386DX-40 in a 132-pin PQFP, soldered onboard

General information
- Launched: 1991
- Marketed by: AMD
- Designed by: AMD
- Common manufacturer: AMD
- Product code: 23936

Performance
- Max. CPU clock rate: 20 MHz to 40 MHz
- FSB speeds: 20 MHz to 40 MHz

Physical specifications
- Cores: 1
- Packages: DX variant: 132-pin PGA; 132-pin PQFP; SX variant: 88-pin PGA; 100-pin PQFP; DE variant: 132-pin PGA 132-pin PQFP

Cache
- L1 cache: Motherboard dependent
- L2 cache: none

Architecture and classification
- Application: Desktop, Embedded (DE/SE-Models)
- Technology node: 1.5 μm to 0.8 μm
- Microarchitecture: 80386
- Instruction set: x86 (IA-32)

History
- Predecessor: Am286
- Successor: Am486

The Am386 CPU is a 100%-compatible clone of the Intel 80386 design released by AMD in March 1991. It sold millions of units, positioning AMD as a legitimate competitor to Intel, rather than being merely a second source for x86 CPUs (then termed 8086-family).

== History and design ==
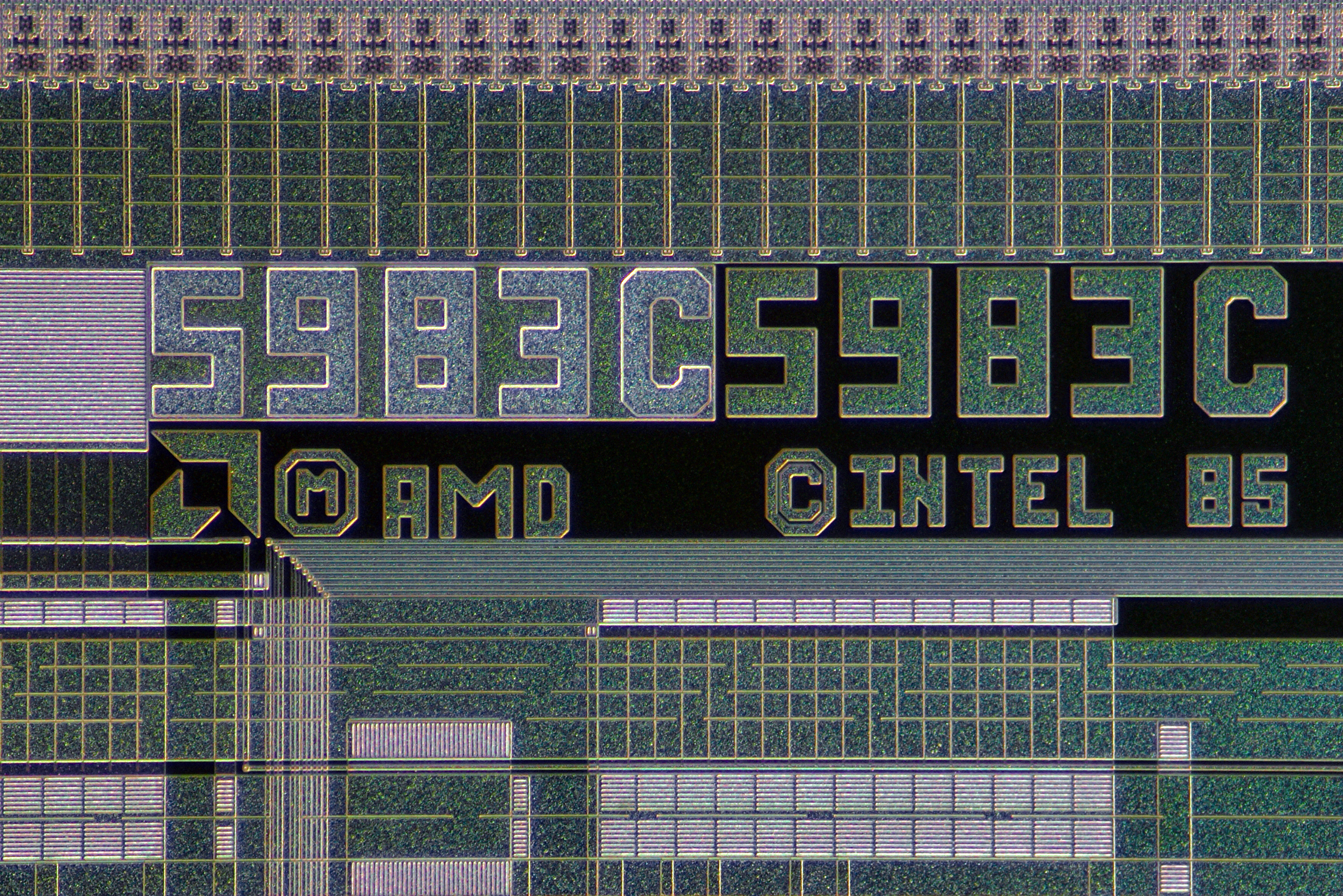
Wafer of an Am386 processor with Intel copyright notice

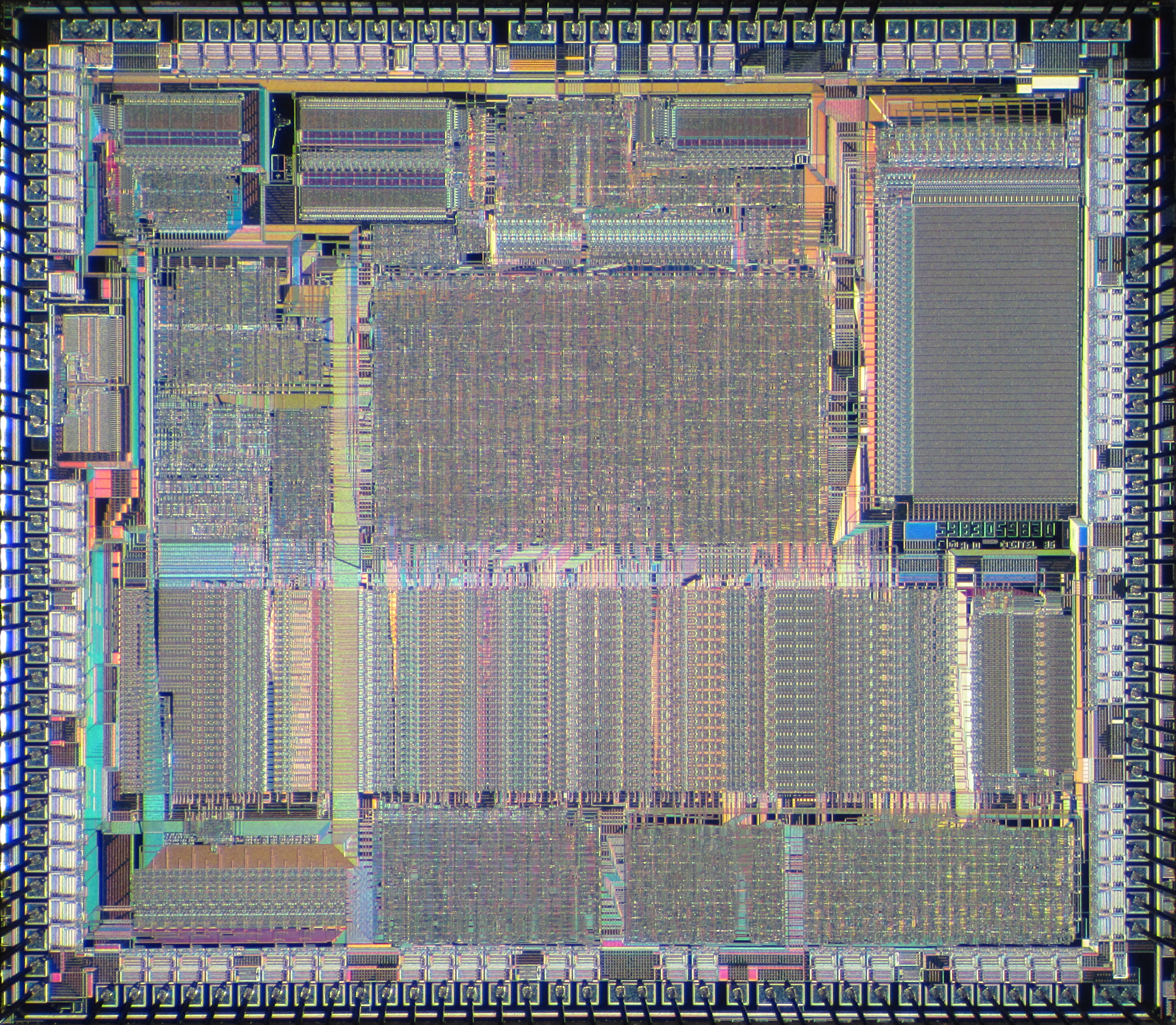
Die of AMD Am386DX

While the AM386 CPU was essentially ready to be released prior to 1991, Intel kept it tied up in court. Intel learned of the Am386 when both companies hired employees with the same name who coincidentally stayed at the same hotel, which accidentally forwarded a package for AMD to Intel's employee. AMD had previously been a second-source manufacturer of Intel's Intel 8086, Intel 80186 and Intel 80286 designs, and AMD's interpretation of the contract, made up in 1982, was that it covered all derivatives of them. Intel, however, claimed that the contract only covered the 80286 and prior processors and forbade AMD the right to manufacture 80386 CPUs in 1987. After a few years in the courtrooms, AMD finally won the case and the right to sell their Am386 in March 1991. This also paved the way for competition in the 80386-compatible 32-bit CPU market and so lowered the cost of owning a PC.

While Intel's 386 CPUs had topped out at 33 MHz in 1989, AMD introduced 40 MHz versions of both its 386DX and 386SX out of the gate, extending the lifespan of the architecture. In the following two years the AMD 386DX-40 saw popularity with small manufacturers of PC clones and with budget-minded computer enthusiasts because it offered near-80486 performance at a much lower price than an actual 486. Generally the 386DX-40 performs nearly on par with a 25 MHz 486 due to the 486 needing fewer clock cycles per instruction, thanks to its tighter pipelining (more overlapping of internal processing) in combination with an on-chip CPU cache. However, its 32-bit 40 MHz data bus gave the 386DX-40 comparatively good memory and I/O performance.

Intel responded to AMD's 40-Mhz 386 with the 486SX.

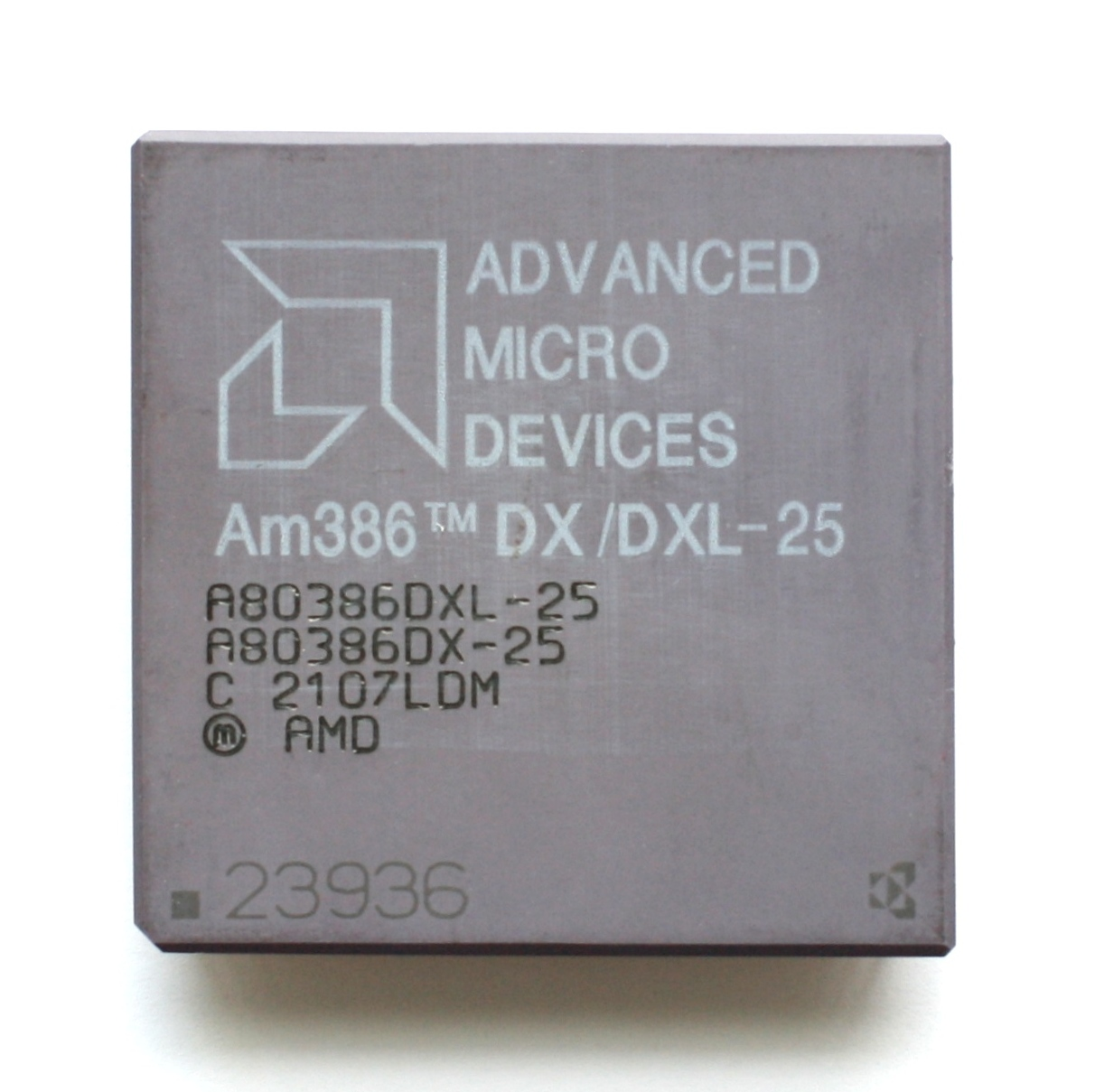
An Am386DX-25

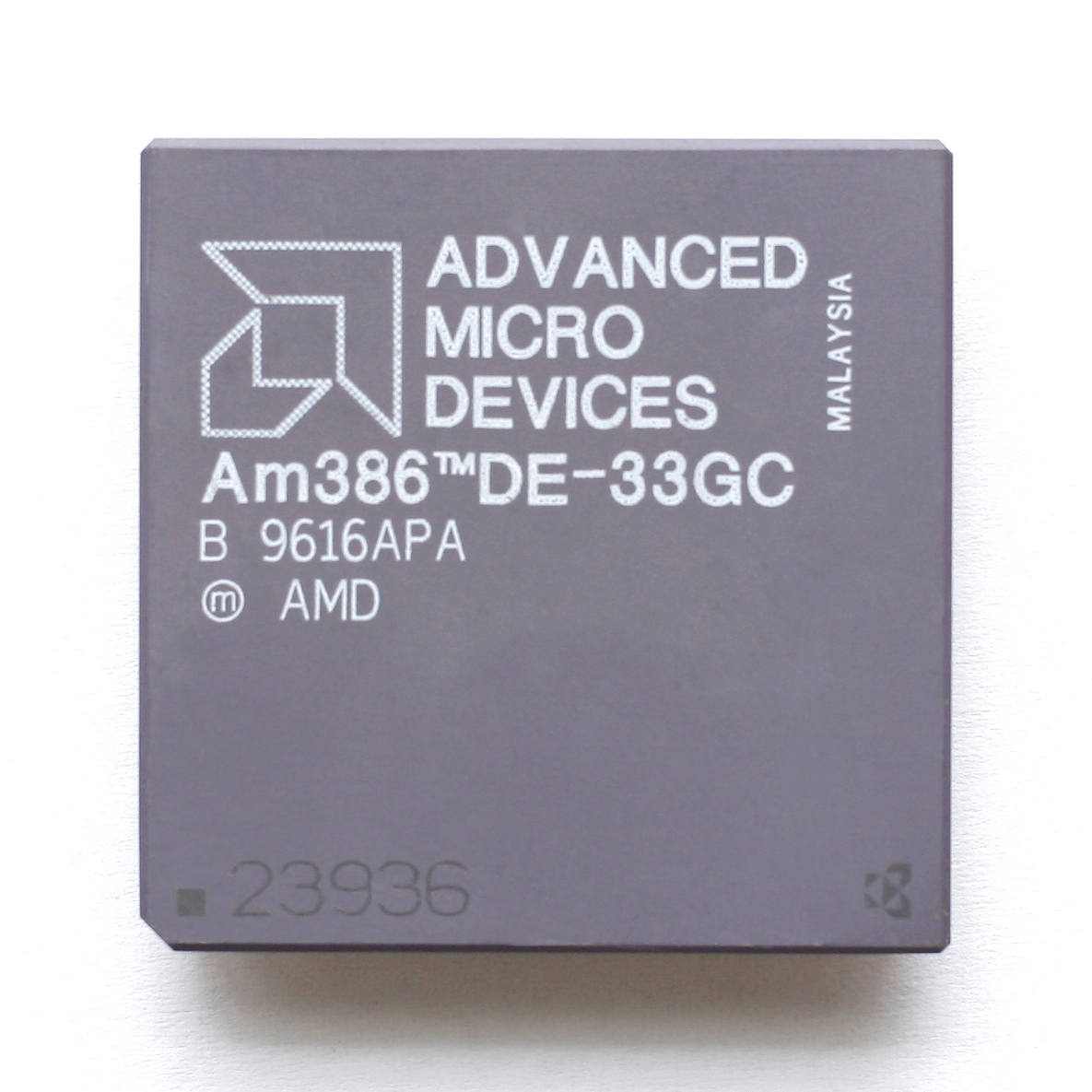
The Am386DE-33 is an embedded version of the Am386DX-33.

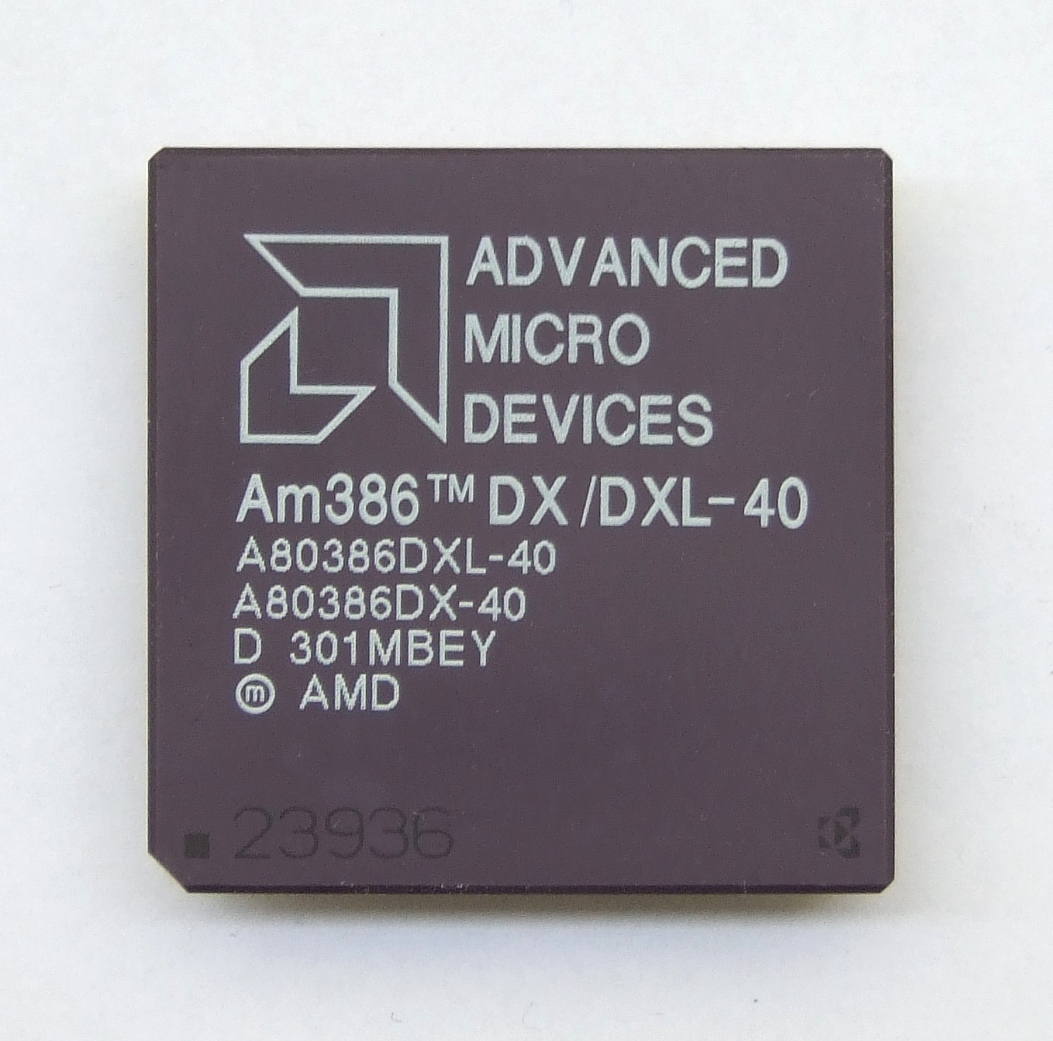
A PGA Am386DX-40

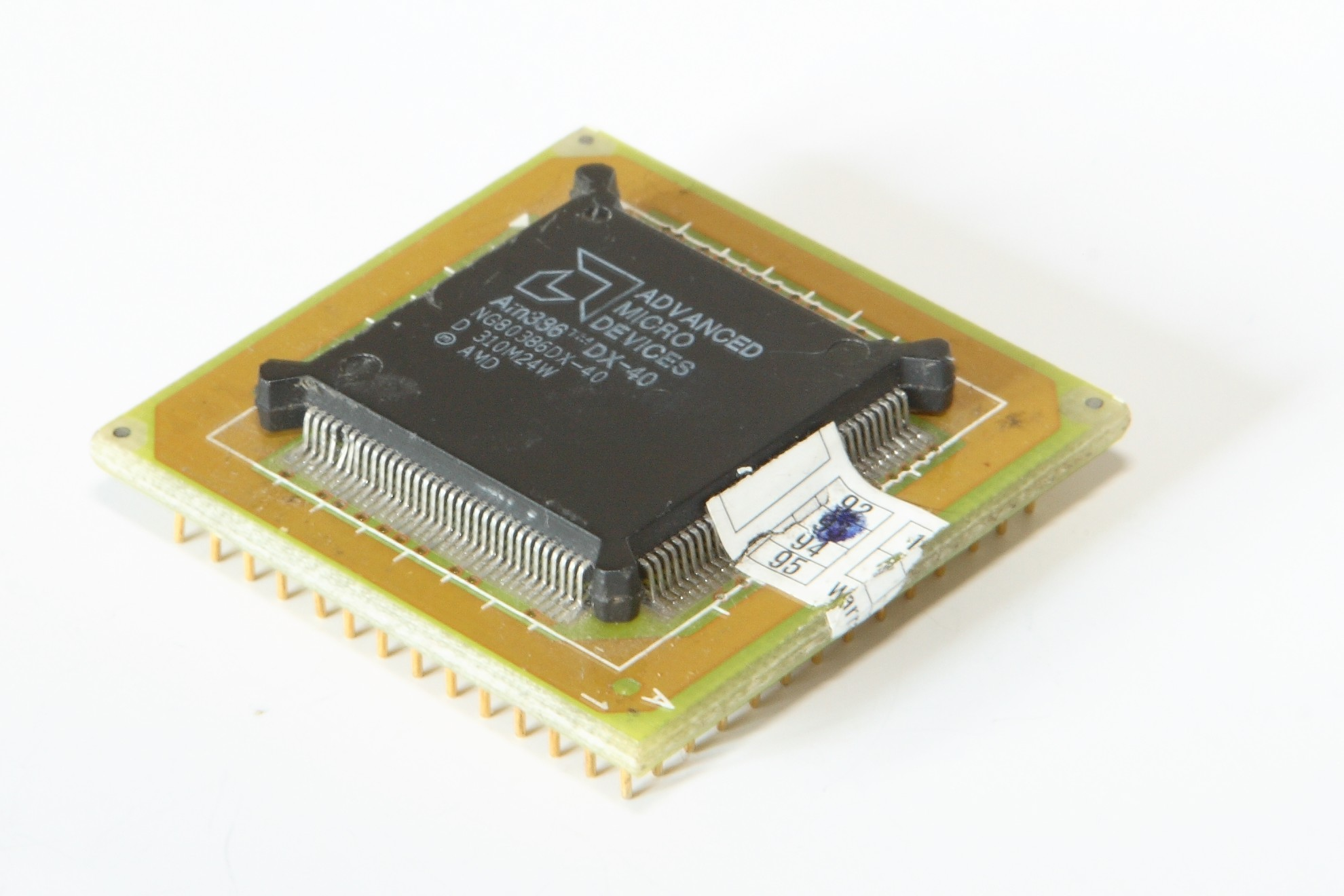
A PQFP Am386DX-40 on a 132-pin PGA adapter

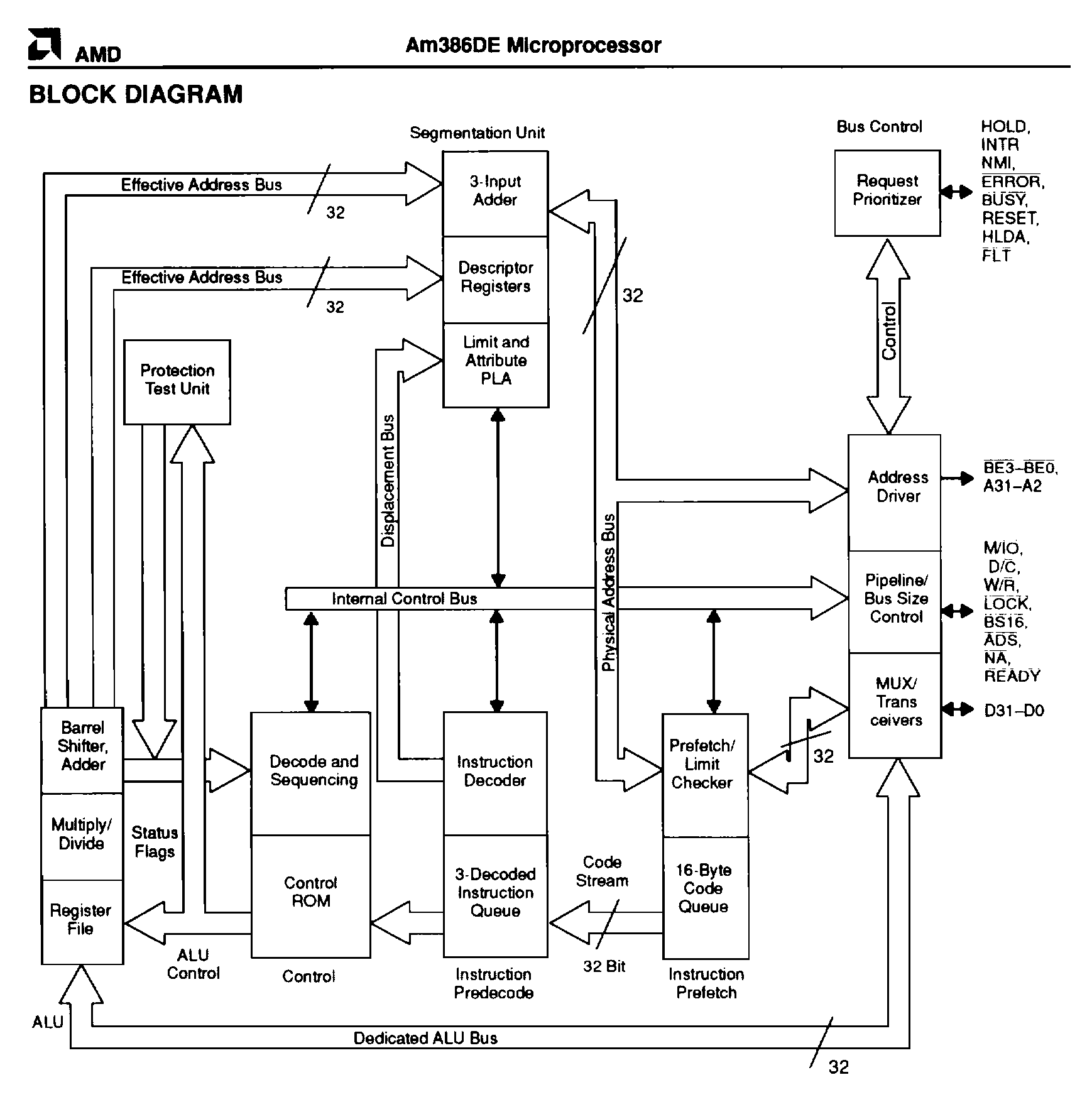
AMD Am386DE block diagram. There is not a Paging Unit like a DX CPU.

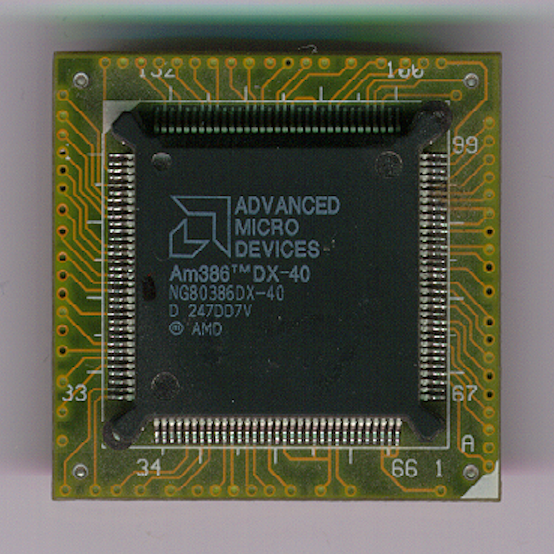
A scan of an AMD Am386™DX-40 mounted on a PGA adapter

=== Am386DX data ===
- 32-bit data bus, can select between either a 32-bit bus or a 16-bit bus by use of the BS16 input
- 32-bit physical address space, 4 Gbyte physical memory address space
- fetches code in four-byte units
- released in March 1991 (October 1991 for DXLV/SXLV variants with SMM)

The various models of the Am386DX, data from
Model number	Frequency	FSB	Voltage	Power	Socket
AMD Am386DX/DXL-20	20 MHz		5 V	1.05 Watt	132-pin CPGA
AMD Am386DX/DXL-25	25 MHz		5 V	1.31 Watt	132-pin CPGA
AMD Am386DX/DXL-33	33 MHz		5 V	1.73 Watt	132-pin CPGA
AMD Am386DX/DXL-40	40 MHz		5 V	2.10 Watt	132-pin CPGA
AMD Am386DX-40	40 MHz		5 V	3.03 Watt	132-pin PQFP
AMD Am386DXLV-25	25 MHz		3-5 V	445 mW (at 3.3V)	132-pin PQFP, 132-pin PGA
AMD Am386DXLV-33	33 MHz		5 V	1.65 Watt	132-pin PQFP, 132-pin PGA

=== Am386DE data ===
- 32-bit data bus, can select between either a 32-bit bus or a 16-bit bus by use of the BS16 input
- 32-bit physical address space, 4 Gbyte physical memory address space
- fetches code in four-byte units
- no paging unit

The various models of the Am386DE, data from
Model number	Frequency	FSB	Voltage	Power	Socket	Release date
AMD Am386DE-25KC	25 MHz		3-5 V	0.32-1.05 Watt	132-pin PQFP	1994
AMD Am386DE-33KC	33 MHz		5 V	1.05-1.35 Watt	132-pin PQFP	1994
AMD Am386DE-33GC	33 MHz		5 V	1.05-1.35 Watt	132-pin CPGA	1994

== AM386 SX ==
In 1991 AMD also introduced advanced versions of the 386SX processor – again not as a second source production of the Intel chip, but as a reverse engineered pin compatible version. In fact, it was AMD's first entry in the x86 market other than as a second source for Intel. AMD 386SX processors were available at higher clock speeds at the time they were introduced and still cheaper than the Intel 386SX. Produced in 0.8 μm technology and using a static core, their clock speed could be dropped down to 0 MHz, consuming just some mWatts. Power consumption was up to 35% lower than with Intel's design and even lower than the 386SL's, making the AMD 386SX the ideal chip for both desktop and mobile computers. The SXL versions featured advanced power management functions and used even less power.

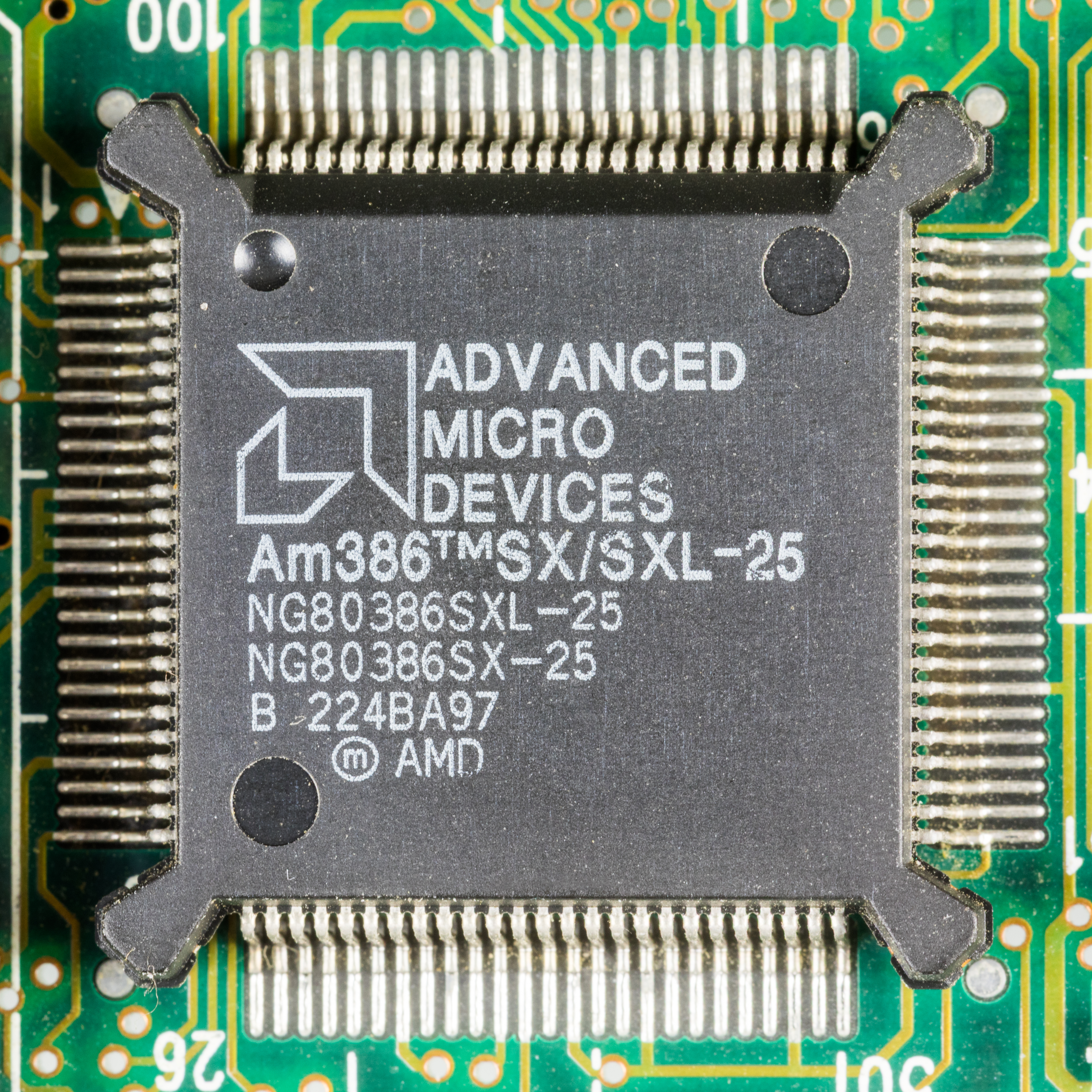
An Am386SX-25

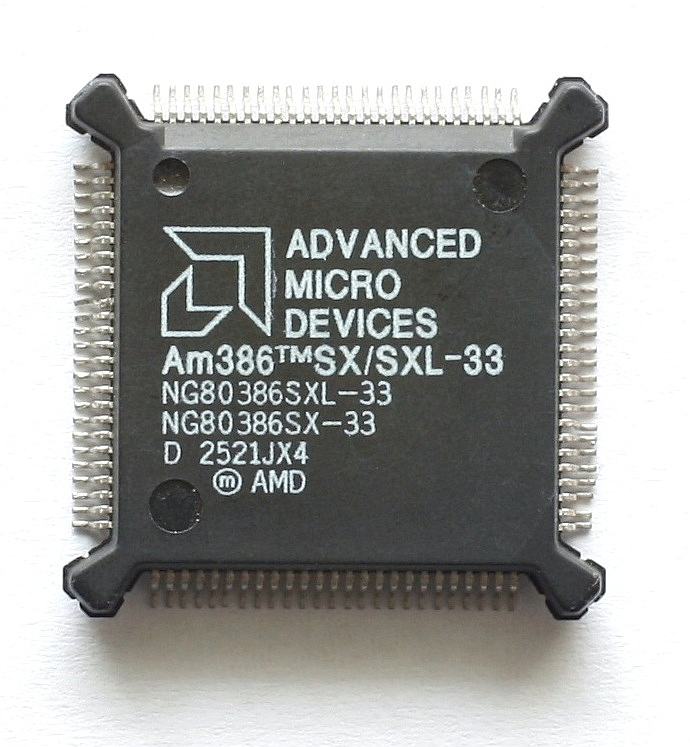
An Am386SX-33

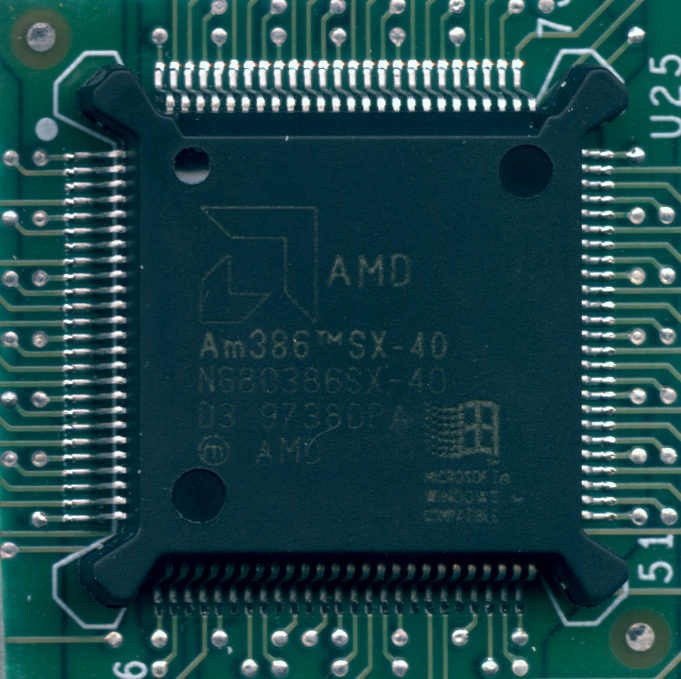
An Am386SX-40

=== Am386SX data ===
- 16-bit data bus, no bus sizing option
- 24-bit physical address space, 16 Mbyte physical memory address space
- prefetch unit reads two bytes as one unit (like the 80286).

The various models of the Am386SX, data from
Model number	Frequency	FSB	Voltage	Power	Socket	Release date
AMD Am386SX/SXL-20	20 MHz		5 V	1.68/0.85 Watt	100-pin PQFP	1991
AMD Am386SX/SXL-25	25 MHz		5 V	1.84/1.05 Watt	100-pin PQFP	29 April 1991
AMD Am386SX/SXL-33	33 MHz		5 V	1.35 Watt	100-pin PQFP	1992
AMD Am386SX-40	40 MHz		5 V	1.55 Watt	100-pin PQFP	1991
AMD Am386SXLV-20	20 MHz		3-5V		100-pin PQFP	October 1991
AMD Am386SXLV-25	25 MHz		3-5V	412 mW (at 3.3V)	100-pin PQFP	October 1991

=== Am386SE data ===
- 16-bit data bus, no bus sizing option
- 24-bit physical address space, 16 Mbyte physical memory address space
- prefetch unit reads two bytes as one unit (like the 80286).
- no paging unit

The various models of the Am386SE, data from
Model number	Frequency	FSB	Voltage	Socket	Release date
AMD Am386SE-25KC	25 MHz		3-5 V	100-pin PQFP	1994
AMD Am386SE-25KI	25 MHz		3-5 V	100-pin PQFP	1994
AMD Am386SE-25VC	25 MHz		3-5 V	100-pin TQFP	1994
AMD Am386SE-25VI	25 MHz		3-5 V	100-pin TQFP	1994
AMD Am386SE-33KC	33 MHz		5 V	100-pin PQFP	1994

== Embedded Am386 processors ==
The Am386 processor core has been used in some embedded processors. In October 1993, AMD introduced the Am386SC processor, which integrated an Am386SXLV CPU core with a collection of PC/AT-compatible peripherals. This processor, marketed as "Élan SC300" and "Élan SC310", was the first in AMD's Élan series of SoCs. In 1994, AMD announced the Am386EM microcontroller, which integrated an Am386 CPU core with a collection of 80186-compatible peripherals rather than PC/AT peripherals. This chip does not, however, appear to have been released, although a datasheet exists.

== i387 coprocessor ==
Floating point performance of the Am386 could be boosted with the addition of a i387DX or i387SX coprocessor, although performance would still not approach that of the on-chip FPU of the i486DX. This made the Am386DX a suboptimal choice for scientific applications and CAD using floating point intensive calculations. However, both were niche markets in the early 1990s and the chip sold well, first as a mid-range contender, and then as a budget chip. Although motherboards using the older 386 CPUs often had limited memory expansion possibilities and therefore struggled under Windows 95's memory requirements, boards using the Am386 were sold well into the mid-1990s; at the end as budget motherboards for those who were only interested in running MS-DOS or Windows 3.1x applications. The Am386 and its low-power successors were also popular choices for embedded systems, for a much longer period than their life span as PC processors.

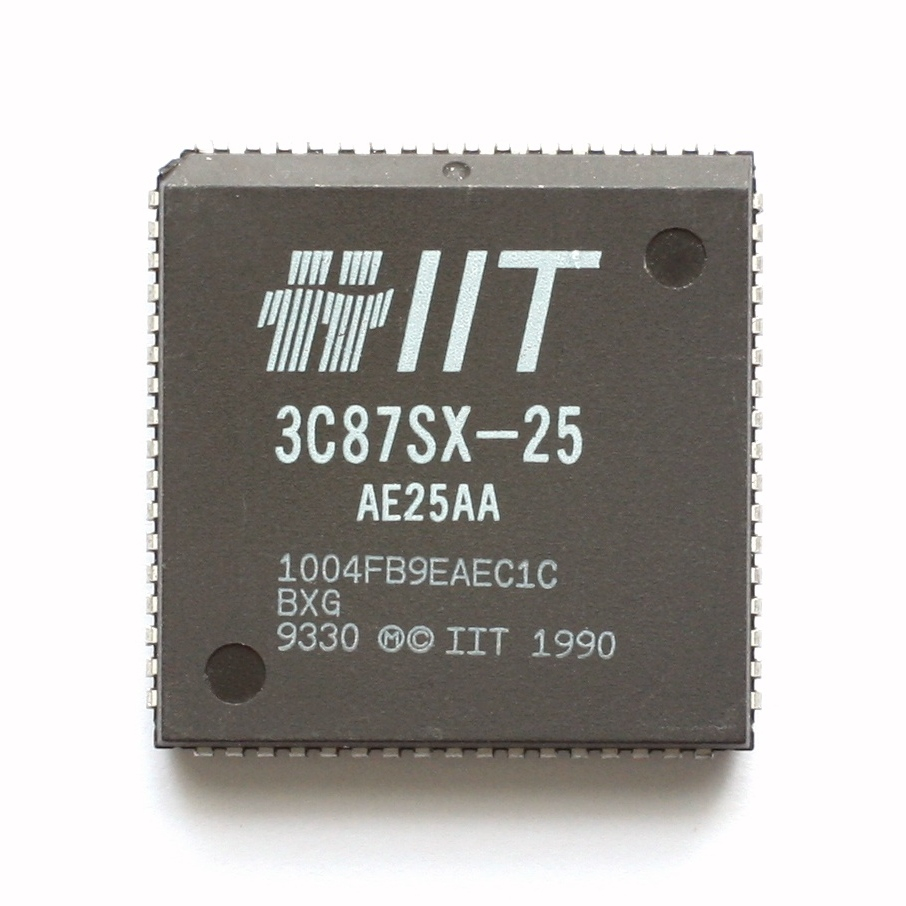
An IIT 387SX-25 Coprocessor

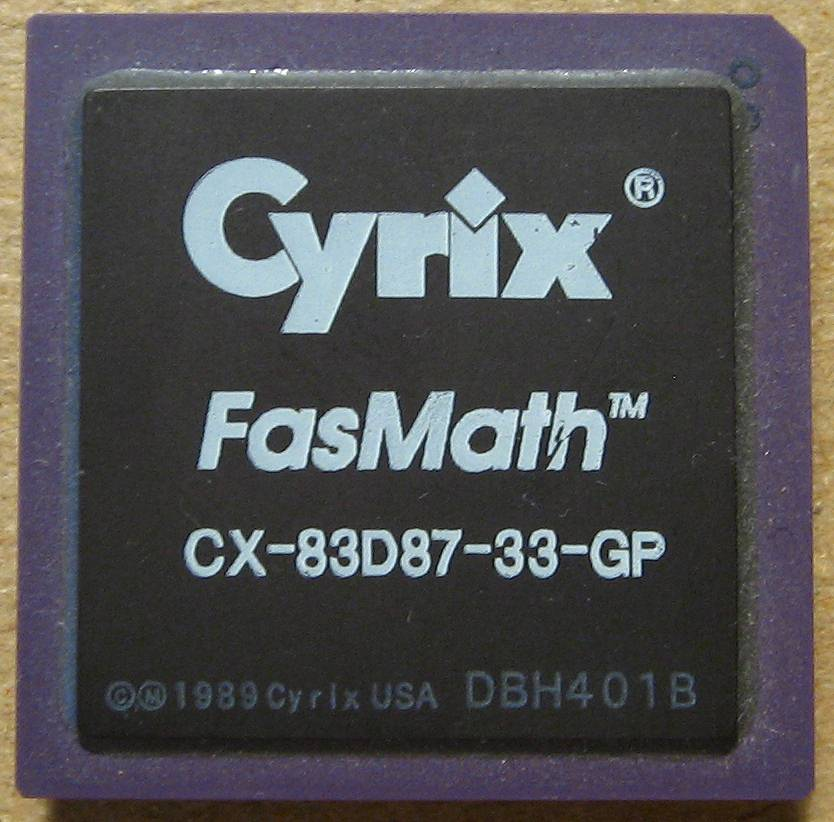
A Cyrix FasMath 387DX-33 Coprocessor

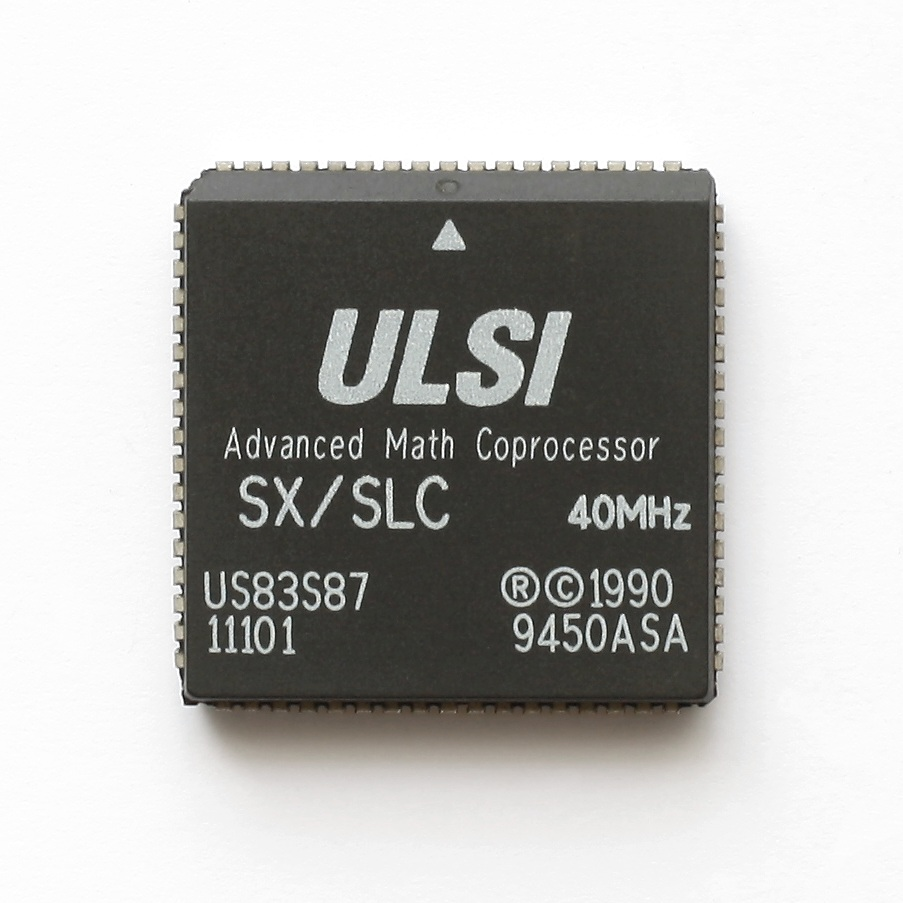
An ULSI 387SX-40 Coprocessor
