= Poorest Areas Civil Society Program =

The Poorest Areas Civil Society (PACS) program (which ran from 2001–2008) was designed to help millions of people living in some of India’s poorest districts. Its goal was to cut the poverty rate in India in half by the year 2015. Through a network of 665 civil society organizations, it covered almost 20,000 villages in 94 districts in 6 Indian states. PACS received over $25 million funding from the UK’s Department for Internal Development (DFID). In addition to raising public awareness about the plight of poor Indians, PACS distributed food and ration cards to impoverished families, helped to set up a variety of social welfare programs (such as pension programs for retirees and widows, programs to help the disabled, scholarship programs, etc.) and gave additional funding to existing infrastructure programs so that water, electrical and sanitation systems could be improved in urban areas and could be constructed in rural areas that had been without these services before. PACS was also involved in fostering women’s rights in India–particularly in sending more little girls to school, encouraging more women to vote and educating the population about family planning options. Additionally, a drought and disaster relief fund was created to assist rural farmers. Finally, PACS encouraged more poor people to participate in the political process (through voting, through community action programs, etc.) in the hopes of giving them the tools that they will need to help themselves in the future
