= Control =

Control may refer to:

== Basic meanings ==
=== Economics and business ===
- Control (management), an element of management
- Control, an element of management accounting
- Comptroller (or controller), a senior financial officer in an organization
- Controlling interest, a percentage of voting stock shares sufficient to prevent opposition
- Foreign exchange controls, regulations on trade
- Internal control, a process to help achieve specific goals typically related to managing risk

=== Mathematics and science ===
- Control (optimal control theory), a variable for steering a controllable system of state variables toward a desired goal
- Controlling for a variable in statistics
- Scientific control, an experiment in which "confounding variables" are minimised to reduce error
- Control variables, variables which are kept constant during an experiment
- Biological pest control, a natural method of controlling pests
- Control network in geodesy and surveying, a set of reference points of known geospatial coordinates
- Control room, a room where a physical facility can be monitored
- Process control in continuous production processes
- Security controls, safeguards against security risks

=== Medicine ===
- Control, according to the ICD-10-PCS, in the Medical and Surgical Section (0), is the root operation (# 3) that means stopping, or attempting to stop, post-procedural bleeding
  - Chlordiazepoxide, also sold under the trade name Control
  - Lorazepam, sold under the trade name Control

=== Systems engineering, computing and technology ===
- Automatic control, the application of control theory for regulation of processes without direct intervention
- Control character, or non-printing character, in a character set; does not represent a written symbol, but is used to control the interpretation or display of text
  - Unicode control characters, characters with no visual or spatial representation
- Control engineering, a discipline of modeling and controlling of systems
- Control system, the ability to control some mechanical or chemical equipment
- Control theory, the mathematical theory about controlling dynamical systems over time
- Control flow, means of specifying the sequence of operations in computer programs
- Control variables in programming, which regulate the flow of control
- Control key on a computer keyboard
- GUI widget (control or widget), a component of a graphical user interface
- Input device (control), a physical user interface to a computer system

=== Society, psychology and sociology ===
- Control (psychology)
- Control freak, a person who attempts to dictate
- Controlling behavior in relationships (also called coercive control)
- Locus of control, an extent to which individuals believe that they can control events that affect them
- Mind control, the use of manipulative methods to persuade others (brainwashing)
- Power (social and political), the ability to control others
- Self-control, the ability to control one's emotions and desires
- Social control, mechanisms that regulate social behavior
- Civilian control of the military

=== Other basic uses ===
- Control point (orienteering), a marked waypoint in orienteering and related sports
- Control (linguistics), a relation between elements of two clauses

== Places ==
- Control, Alberta

== Media ==
=== Books ===
- Control (novel), 1982, by William Goldman
- Control (fictional character), in the 1974 British spy novel Tinker, Tailor, Soldier, Spy

=== Films ===
- Control (1987 film) or Il Giorno prima, a 1987 made-for-television film starring Burt Lancaster
- Control (2004 film), starring Ray Liotta, Willem Dafoe and Michelle Rodriguez
- Control (2007 film), about Joy Division singer Ian Curtis, directed by Anton Corbijn
- Control (2013 film), a Chinese–Hong Kong film written and directed by Kenneth Bi
- Control (2023 film), a British film directed by Gene Fallaize and featuring the voice of Kevin Spacey
- Control (upcoming film), directed by Robert Schwentke and starring James McAvoy
- Kontroll, a 2003 Hungarian film, released as Control internationally
- Control, a UK comedy short by Frank Miller

=== Television ===
- Control (House), a 2005 episode of the television series House
- Control, a Spanish-language series aired on Univision
- Control, a recurring character in the sketch programme A Bit of Fry & Laurie
- Control, a character on the science fiction crime drama Person of Interest
- [C] - The Money of Soul And Possibility Control, or [C] - Control, a 2011 anime
- Ctrl (web series), an American comedy web series
- CONTROL (Get Smart), a fictional counter-espionage agency

=== Games ===
- Control and control-bid, features of the game contract bridge
- Control (video game), 2019, by Remedy Entertainment

=== Music ===
==== Albums ====
- Control (GoodBooks album), 2007
- Control (Janet Jackson album), 1986
- Control (Kensington album), 2016
- Control (Pedro the Lion album), 2002
- Control, a 2011 album by Abandon
- Control, a 2014 album by The Brew
- Control, a 1981 album by Conrad Schnitzler
- Control, a 2013 EP by Disclosure
- Control, a 1994 album by Hellnation
- Control, a 2012 EP by The Indecent
- Control, a 1971 album by John St Field
- Control, a 2012 album by Uppermost
- Control, a 2003 album by Where Fear and Weapons Meet
- Ctrl (SZA album), 2017

==== Songs ====
- "Control" (Big Sean song), 2013
- "Control" (Garbage song), 2012
- "Control" (Janet Jackson song), 1986
- "Control" (Kid Sister song), 2007
- "Control" (Matrix & Futurebound song), 2013
- "Control" (Metro Station song), 2007
- "Control" (Mutemath song), 2004
- "Control" (Puddle of Mudd song), 2001
- "Control" (Tank song), 2025
- "Control" (Traci Lords song), 1994
- "Control" (Zoe Wees song), 2020
- "Control", by Ayra Starr from The Year I Turned 21, 2024
- "Control", by Amyl and the Sniffers from Amyl and the Sniffers, 2019
- "Control", by Basement from Colourmeinkindness, 2012
- "Control", by the Black Dahlia Murder from Everblack, 2013
- "Control", by Delta Goodrem from Child of the Universe, 2012
- "Control", by Disclosure from The Face, 2012
- "Control", by División Minúscula, 2008
- "Control", by Doja Cat from Purrr!, 2014
- "Control", by Earshot from Two, 2004
- "Control", by Feder, 2018
- "Control", by Ghost9 from Now: Who We Are Facing, 2021
- "Control", by Halsey from Badlands, 2015
- "Control", by London Grammar from Truth Is a Beautiful Thing, 2017
- "Control", by Playboi Carti from Whole Lotta Red, 2020
- "Control", by Poe from Haunted, 2000
- "Control", by Stabbing Westward from Ungod, 1994
- "Control", by Wisin from El Regreso del Sobreviviente, 2014
- "Control (Somehow You Want Me)", by Tenth Avenue North from Followers, 2016

==== Other uses in music ====
- Kontrol, a Bulgarian punk band
- Control (Starlight Express), a character from the rock musical

== See also ==
- Action (disambiguation)
- Control point (disambiguation)
- Control unit (disambiguation)
- Controller (disambiguation)
- Damage control (disambiguation)
- Uncontrolled (disambiguation)
