= Damage control =

Damage control is the limiting of damage resulting from an action when damage cannot be avoided.

Damage control may also refer to:

== Music ==
- Damage Control (album), by Mat Zo, 2013
- "Damage Control", a song by Man Overboard from Heart Attack
- "Damage Control", a song by John Petrucci from Suspended Animation

== Science and technology ==
- Damage control surgery, quickly controlling exsanguinating hemorrhage and/or gross contamination using abbreviated interventions
- Damage control (maritime), the emergency control of situations that may hazard the sinking of a ship

== Organizations ==
- Damage Control (company), a manufacturer of guitar effects pedals and preamps
- Damage CTRL, a professional wrestling stable in WWE formerly named Damage Control

== Television series and comics ==
- Damage Control (TV series), a reality television series airing on MTV
- Damage Control (Big Love), an episode of the American TV series Big Love
- Damage Control (comics), a comic book limited series published by Marvel Comics, featuring a fictitious company by the same name
  - Damage Control (Marvel Cinematic Universe), in Marvel Cinematic Universe media

== Other uses ==
- Another term for crisis management in public relations
