= Primary airport control station =

Primary Airport Control Station, or PACS, is a survey marker established in the vicinity of an airport and tied directly to the National Spatial Reference System. This control consists of permanent marks with precisely determined latitudes, longitudes and elevations. PACS and SACS are designated by the National Geodetic Survey and must meet the specific siting, construction, and accuracy requirements.

PACS coordinates are established by meeting a survey, data processing, adjustment and reporting standard known as the NGS Bluebook.

== See also ==
- Airport security
- Aviation safety
