= Rodney J. Rogers =

Serial entrepreneur and expert technologist

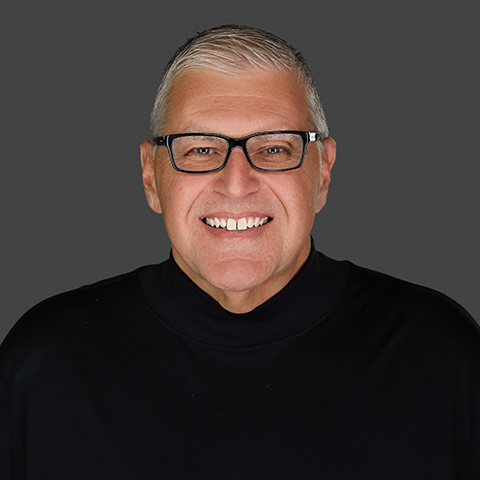
- Born: September 18, 1965; Florida, United States
- Died: September 28, 2024 (aged 59)
- Education: University of Florida
- Occupation: Entrepreneur
- Known for: Founding Partner, Blue Lagoon Companies & Virtustream
- Spouse: Judith
- Children: 3

Rodney J. Rogers was an American entrepreneur and expert technologist with more than 30 years in the technology services industry. He died of cancer on September 28, 2024.

He had a leadership role at two "unicorns" startups that achieved billion-dollar valuations.

== Early life and education ==
A native of Florida and resident of Miami, Rogers graduated from the University of Florida with a Bachelor of Science degree in Industrial and Systems Engineering.

== Career ==
Rogers started his career in 1988 at Andersen Consulting, known today as Accenture. Rogers developed and implemented software technologies in the manufacturing and distribution industries. He was promoted to manager in 1992.

In 1994, he left to work directly for one of his clients, Florida Crystals Corporation. At 28 years old, Rogers was hired to run Florida Crystals Corporation's Consumer Products Division as its general manager, which he continued to do until he co-founded Adjoined in 2000.

Florida Crystals Corporation remained a customer of Rogers for 25+ years, from Accenture, to Adjoined, through Kanbay, Capgemini, Virtustream, EMC and Dell Technologies.

=== Adjoined ===
Rogers was co-founder, chairman and CEO of Adjoined from its inception in 2000 through its acquisition by Kanbay in 2006. Adjoined was one of the fastest growing US-based IT services companies over this time. After the acquisition in 2006, Rogers went onto become COO and SEC Section-16 Officer of Kanbay, a 7,000 person global IT Services firm. In 2007, Kanbay was acquired by Capgemini SE for $1.2 billion. After the acquisition, Rogers became managing director of Capgemini's East US Business and served on Capgemini's US Country Managing Board until he retired from Capgemini in 2008.

=== Virtustream and Dell Technologies ===
Rogers co-founded Virtustream in 2009 and was chairman and CEO prior to its acquisition by EMC Corporation (now Dell Technologies) in 2015 for $1.2 billion.

The acquisition of Virtustream was one of the largest private technology start-up acquisitions in 2015.

After the EMC acquisition, Virtustream became one of EMC's 4 operating companies with Rogers as CEO reporting to the CEO of $24b EMC. In 2016, Dell Technologies acquired EMC for $60+ billion in the largest acquisition in the history of the technology industry.

From 2016 until the time he retired in 2018, within Dell Technologies, Rogers served as the president of the Virtustream business, a member of both the Dell EMC Infrastructure Solutions Group and Dell Services & Digital executive leadership teams, and as member of the Dell Technologies extended leadership team.

=== Blue Lagoon Companies ===
Rogers operates as a founding partner of the Blue Lagoon Companies, which, develops, advises and invests in disruptive technology start-ups and next-generation technology companies.

== Recognition ==
Rogers was an American Business Awards CEO winner, and was recognized along with co-founder Kevin Reid as Intel Capital's Entrepreneur/Exit of the Year in 2015.

== Personal life ==
Rogers was an angel investor and adviser to a variety of technology startups. He was chairman of the board for UnitedLex, Inc. and Lemongrass Ltd, Lead Board Director for Beep, Inc., and a board director at Revenue Analytics, Inc. and agrematch Ltd. Rogers previously served on the Board of New Signature, Inc. prior to its sale to Cognizant in 2020.

He was also the co-founder and director of The Blue Lagoon Foundation, a charity, and he established the Rodney & Judith Rogers Entrepreneurial Excellence Endowment for the Warrington School of Business at the University of Florida. Rogers was also an advisor to the University of Florida's Innovative Ventures Fund, and in 2020 was awarded the University of Florida's Distinguished Alumnus Award.

Rogers was co-inventor of US Patent 8,799,920 B2: "Systems and Methods of Host-Aware Resource Management Involving Cluster-Based Resource Pools". He has also been both the subject and author of several technology industry-related articles and publications.

He was married to Judith and had three children, daughter Leah Grace; son Benjamin Henry; and daughter Jamie Elaine. He died of cancer on September 28, 2024 in Florida.
