= Enomaly =

Cloud computing company

Enomaly Inc.
- Industry: Software
- Founded: 2004
- Founder: Reuven Cohen; George Bazos; Lars Forsberg
- Headquarters: Toronto, Ontario, Canada
- Parent: Virtustream

Enomaly Inc., (founded in 2004) is a developer of system software for the virtualization and management of cloud computing. It is headquartered in Toronto, Ontario Canada. In 2011, Enomaly entered into a definitive agreement to be acquired by Virtustream.

== History ==
Initially founded as an open source consulting company by Reuven Cohen, George Bazos and Lars Forsberg, the company began as an open source consultancy and system integrator before offering cloud computing space products and an infrastructure-as-a-Service platform . Richard Reiner joined Enomaly as chairman and CEO in March, 2009.

Enomaly released Elastic Computing Platform, Service Provider Edition (ECP/SPE) in July, 2009, a service for web hosts and service providers to build their own public facing IaaS and cloud services vis-à-vis Amazon Ec2. Through ECP, Enomaly began to offer cloud infrastructure capabilities to carriers, service and hosting providers who in turn use their existing physical data center to offer a combination of cloud services and dedicated hosting services to their customers. In November 2010, Enomaly launched SpotCloud.com, a commodity style clearinghouse for unused cloud computing capacity, before its acquisition by Virtustream.
