= Sogeti =

Division of Capgemini consultancy

Sogeti Group
- Company type: Subsidiary
- Industry: Technology services
- Founded: 1967; 58 years ago
- Founder: Serge Kampf
- Headquarters: Paris, France
- Key people: Christophe Bonnard, Head of Sogeti Global
- Parent: Capgemini
- Website: www.sogeti.com

Sogeti is a Technology Division of Capgemini. Sogeti is specializing in local professional services, with offices in Issy-Les-Moulineaux, employing around 20,000 people in 13 countries. The current head of Sogeti Global is Christophe Bonnard.

== History ==
Sogeti was the original name for Capgemini. The name was an acronym for "Société de Gestion des Entreprises et de Traitement de l'Information" which, roughly means "Business Management and Information Processing Company".

In 2002, the Cap Gemini Group founded a subsidiary called Sogeti in six countries to focus on the local IT market. In 2008, Sogeti UK acquired software testing firm Vizuri with an aim to focus on software testing; currently Sogeti UK has over 600 employees.

In 2010, Capgemini integrated its software testing resources with Sogeti. The Sogeti Graduate Scheme allows non-technical graduates into the technology sector.

Sogeti USA has around 2,300 employees in 22 offices; in 2010, their revenue was about $375 million. In 2013, Sogeti was voted the 10th best company to work for in Washington State.

== Notable projects ==
In 2013, Sogeti built a bespoke data system for The Radiocommunications Agency, who are funded by the Dutch Government. The system was designed to improve business intelligence efficiency.

In 2015, Sogeti helped a French mother create a universal language app. In 2014, French security researcher Jean-Marie Bourbon was suspended from Sogeti for publishing details of flaws in FireEye Malware Analysis System 6.4.

== See also ==
- CEFAM
- DYA framework
