= Lisa Su =

Taiwanese and American business executive (born 1969)

Lisa Su 蘇姿丰
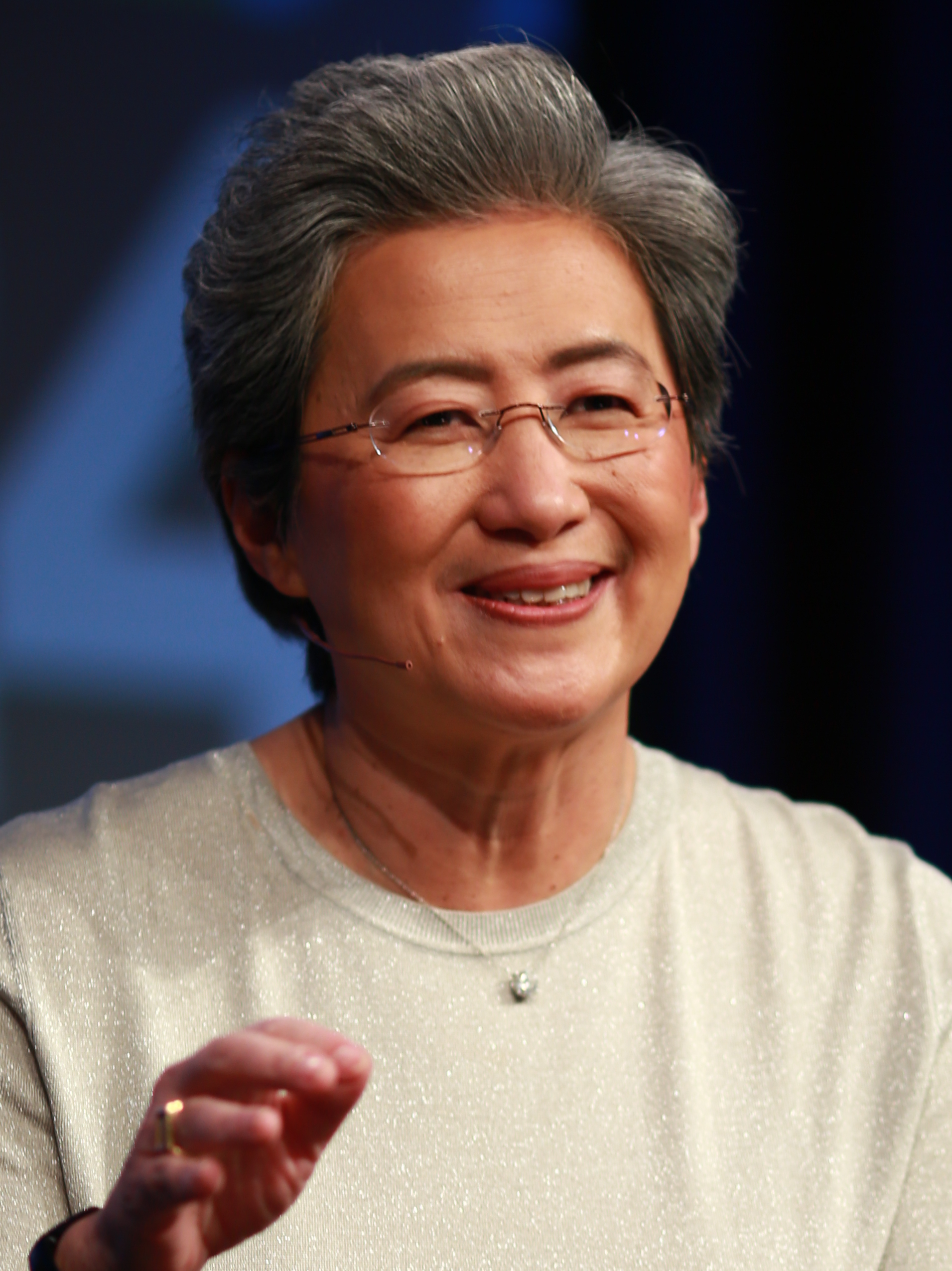
- Su in 2024
- Born: Lisa Tzwu-Fang Su; November 7, 1969 (age 57); Tainan, Taiwan
- Education: Massachusetts Institute of Technology (BS, MS, PhD)
- Known for: Semiconductor design, silicon-on-insulator design
- Title: President and CEO of AMD (2014–present); Chair of AMD (2022–present)
- Term: 2014–present
- Predecessor: Rory Read
- Spouse: Daniel Lin
- Relatives: Jensen Huang (cousin)
- Awards: IEEE Fellow (2009); IEEE Robert N. Noyce Medal (2021); National Medal of Science (2026)
- Scientific career
- Fields: Electrical engineering Computer science
- Thesis: Extreme-submicrometer silicon-on-insulator (SOI) MOSFETs (1994)
- Doctoral advisor: Dimitri A. Antoniadis; James E. Chung

Chinese name
- Traditional Chinese: 蘇姿丰
- Simplified Chinese: 苏姿丰
Transcriptions
Standard Mandarin
- Hanyu Pinyin: Sū Zīfēng
- Bopomofo: ㄙㄨ ㄗ ㄈㄥ
- Wade–Giles: Su^{1} Tzŭ^{1}-fêng^{1}
- IPA: [sú tsɹ̩́.fə́ŋ]
Southern Min
- Hokkien POJ: So͘ Chu-hong
- Tâi-lô: Soo Tsu-hong

Lisa Tzwu-Fang Su (Note: Chinese: 蘇姿丰; Wade–Giles: Sū Tzū-fēng; Tâi-lô: Soo Tsu-hong) (born November 7, 1969) is a Taiwanese and American business executive, computer scientist, and electrical engineer who has been the president and CEO of the American semiconductor company AMD since 2014.

Su was born in Taiwan and immigrated to the United States with her family as a young child. After earning three degrees from the Massachusetts Institute of Technology (MIT), she worked at Texas Instruments, IBM, and Freescale Semiconductor in engineering and management positions. She is known for her work developing silicon-on-insulator semiconductor manufacturing technologies and more efficient semiconductor chips during her time as vice president of IBM's Semiconductor Research and Development Center. Su is also a member of The Business Council.

Su was appointed president and CEO of AMD in October 2014, after joining the company in 2012 and holding roles such as senior vice president of AMD's global business units and chief operating officer. She previously was on the board of Cisco and was elected chair of the board of the U.S. Semiconductor Industry Association in November 2025.

Recognized with a number of awards and accolades, Su was named Executive of the Year by EE Times in 2014, one of the World's Greatest Leaders in 2017 by Fortune and was named CEO of the year in 2024 by Time. She also became the first woman to receive the IEEE Robert Noyce Medal in 2021. When Su became CEO in 2014, AMD's market capitalization was less than $3 billion; in September 2026, it $1 trillion for the first time. AMD also overtook Intel in market capitalization for the first time. In 2024, Su was selected the Fellow of Industrial Technology Research Institute (ITRI). She was named the tenth most powerful woman in the world for 2025 by Forbes. She was named as one of the "Architects of AI" for Time's Person of the Year in 2025.

== Early life and education ==
Lisa Tzwu-Fang Su was born in November 1969 in Tainan, Taiwan. She was born in a Taiwanese Hokkien speaking family. She immigrated to the United States at the age of 3 with her parents Su Chun-hwai (蘇春槐) and Sandy Lo (羅淑雅). She grew up in the Queens borough of New York City. Her father worked as a statistician for the city government. Both she and her brother were encouraged to study math and science as children. When she was seven, her father began quizzing her on multiplication tables. Her mother, an accountant who later became an entrepreneur, introduced her to business concepts.

Su sought to become an engineer at a young age. She recalled, "I just had a great curiosity about how things worked". When she was 10, she began taking apart and then fixing her brother's remote-controlled cars, and she owned her first computer in junior high school, an Apple II. She attended the Bronx High School of Science in New York City, graduating in 1986.

Su began attending the Massachusetts Institute of Technology (MIT) in the fall of 1986, intending to major in either electrical engineering or computer science. She settled on electrical engineering, recollecting that it seemed like the most difficult major. During her freshman year, she worked as an undergraduate research assistant "manufacturing test silicon wafers for graduate students" through the Undergraduate Research Opportunities Program (UROP). The project, and her summer jobs at Analog Devices, fueled her interest in semiconductors. She remained focused on the topic for the remainder of her education, spending much of her time in labs designing and adjusting products.

After earning her bachelor's degree in electrical engineering, Su obtained her master's degree in electrical engineering from MIT in 1991. From 1990 to 1994, she studied for her PhD in electrical engineering under doctoral advisors Dimitri A. Antoniadis and James E. Chung. MIT Technology Review reports that as a doctoral candidate, Su was "one of the first researchers to look into silicon-on-insulator (SOI) technology, a then unproven technique for increasing transistors' efficiency by building them atop layers of an insulating material". She graduated with her Ph.D. in electrical engineering from MIT in 1994. Her dissertation was titled, "Extreme-submicrometer silicon-on-insulator (SOI) MOSFETs".

== Career ==
Su has been on the boards of Analog Devices, Cisco, the Global Semiconductor Alliance, and the U.S. Semiconductor Industry Association. As of 2016, she has published over forty technical articles and coauthored a book chapter discussing next-generation consumer electronics.

=== 1994–1999: Texas Instruments and IBM R&D ===
In 1994, Su became a member of the technical staff at Texas Instruments, working in the company's Semiconductor Process and Device Center (SPDC) until February 1995. That month, IBM hired Su as a research staff member specializing in device physics, and she was appointed vice president of IBM's semiconductor research and development center.

During her time at IBM, Su played a "critical role" in developing the "recipe" to make copper connections work with semiconductor chips instead of aluminum, "solving the problem of preventing copper impurities from contaminating the devices during production". The copper technology was launched in 1998, resulting in new industry standards and chips that were up to 20% faster than the conventional versions.

=== 2000–2007: IBM Emerging Products division ===
In 2000, Su was given a year-long assignment as the technical assistant for Lou Gerstner, IBM's CEO. She subsequently took on the role of director of emerging projects, stating that "I was basically director of myself – there was no one else in the group". As head and founder of IBM's Emerging Products division, Su ran an internal startup and hired ten employees to focus on biochips and "low-power and broadband semiconductors". Their first product was a microprocessor that improved battery life in phones and other handheld devices. MIT Technology Review named her a "Top Innovator Under 35" in 2001, due in part to her work with Emerging Products.

Through her division, Su represented IBM in a collaboration to create next-generation chips with Sony and Toshiba. Ken Kutaragi charged the collaboration with "improving the performance of game machine processors by a factor of 1,000", and Su's team eventually came up with the idea for a nine-processor chip, which later became the Cell microprocessor used to power devices such as the PlayStation 3. She continued as vice president of the semiconductor research and development center at IBM, holding the role until May 2007.

=== 2007–2011: Freescale Semiconductor ===
Su joined Freescale Semiconductor in June 2007 as chief technology officer (CTO), heading the company's research and development until August 2009. From September 2008 until December 2011, she was senior vice president and general manager of Freescale's networking and multimedia group, and was responsible for global strategy, marketing, and engineering for the company's embedded communications and applications processor business. As head of the company's networking-chip business, EE Times credited her with helping Freescale get "its house in order", with the company filing for an initial public offering in 2011.

=== 2012–2014: AMD appointments ===
Su became senior vice president and general manager at AMD in January 2012, overseeing the company's global business units and the "end-to-end business execution" of AMD's products. Over the next two years she "played a prominent role" in pushing the company to diversify beyond the PC market, including working with Microsoft and Sony to place AMD chips in Xbox One and PlayStation 4 game consoles.

On 8 October 2014, AMD announced Su's appointment to president and CEO, replacing Rory Read. Su stated that her plan for the company involved focusing on making the "right technology investments", streamlining the product line, and continuing to diversify, also asserting that she wanted to "simplify" the company and accelerate the development of new technology. A number of analysts praised the appointment due to Su's credentials, noting AMD was seeking growth in product areas where Su had "extensive experience".

=== 2015–2016: AMD diversification ===
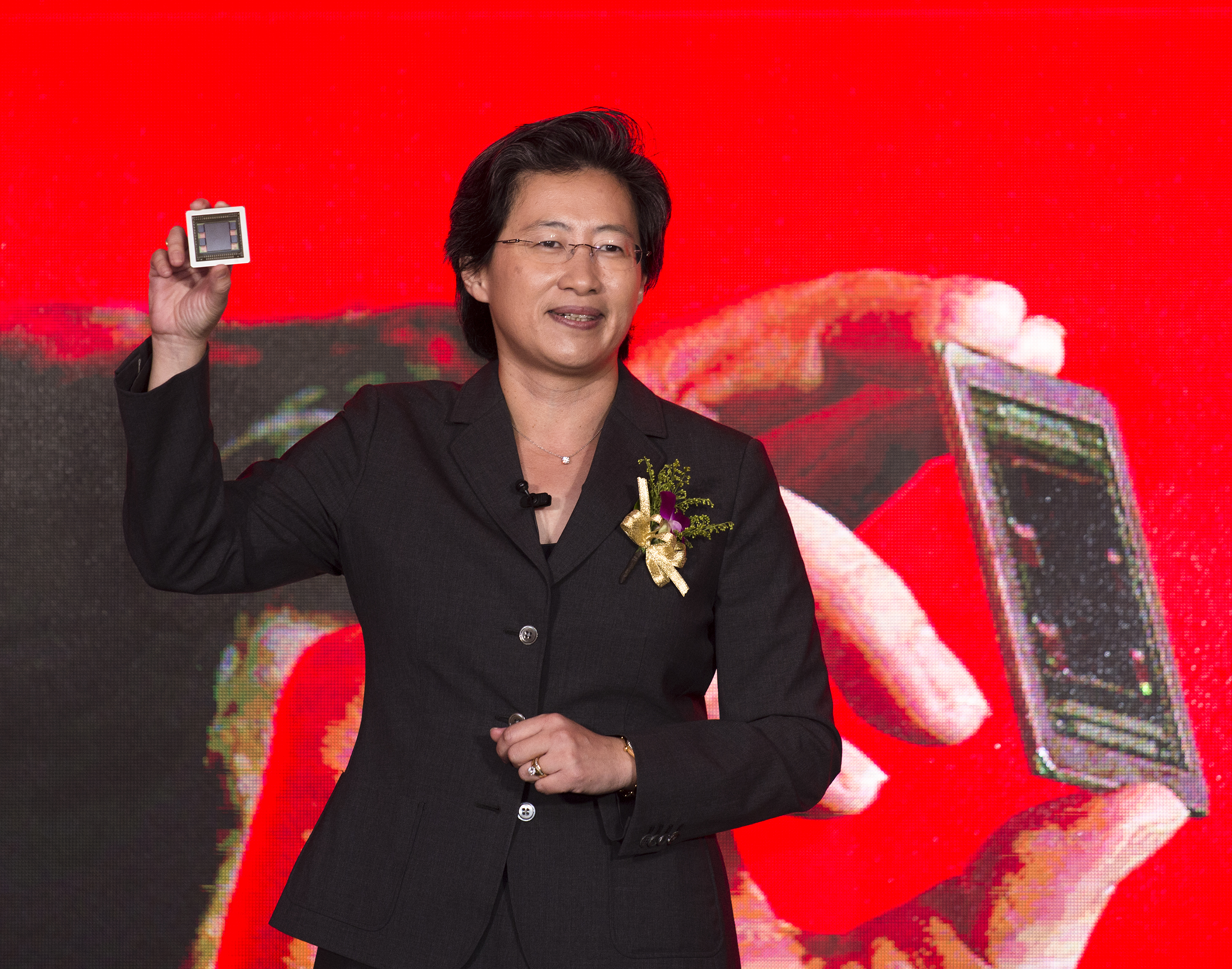
Su in June 2015

When Su joined AMD in 2012, about 10 percent of sales came from non-PC products. By February 2015, roughly 40 percent of AMD's sales came from non-PC markets, such as video game consoles and embedded devices. In May 2015, Su and other AMD executives presented a long-term strategy for the company to focus on developing high-performance computing and graphics technologies for three growth areas: gaming, datacenter, and "immersive platforms" markets.

In January 2016, Su announced that AMD was working on new FinFET-based chips to create a new line of microprocessors, products, accelerated processing units (APUs), graphics chips, and semi-custom chip designs for unreleased video game consoles. AMD reported revenue growth in 2016, attributed in part to its graphics and console chip business. Fortune attributed the "impressive" statistic to Su.

=== 2017–present: Ryzen ===
By 2018, AMD's share of the CPU market had risen to nearly 11%. Ryzen CPUs have received favorable reviews from a variety of news outlets, specifically highlighting their high thread counts at prices drastically lower than those of Intel's, especially in the high-performance computing market with AMD's Ryzen Threadripper line of workstation processors. Su is the first woman ever to top the Associated Press's annual survey of CEO compensation, with her 2019 pay package being valued at $58.5 million.

In February 2022, Su became chair of AMD after completing a reported $49 billion acquisition of FPGA and programmable systems on chip maker Xilinx. In 2023, Su's total compensation from AMD was $30.3 million, representing a CEO-to-median worker pay ratio of 238-to-1.

== Personal life ==
Su and her husband, Daniel Lin (Chinese: 丹尼爾‧林), are based in Austin, Texas. She commutes to AMD's headquarters in Santa Clara, California, several times a month.

Su and Nvidia co-founder and former CEO Jensen Huang are first cousins once removed: Su and Huang first met at an industry event after both had become technology executives. Su's maternal grandfather is the eldest brother of Huang's mother.

Su's father is a member of the Democratic Progressive Party and serves as its Eastern United States chapter's head and the senior advisor to the President of Taiwan, Lai Ching-te, since June 2026.

After she became CEO of AMD, Su got into the habit of boxing regularly with a trainer.

As of 2026, Su has an estimated net worth of more than $3.4 billion.

== Accolades ==
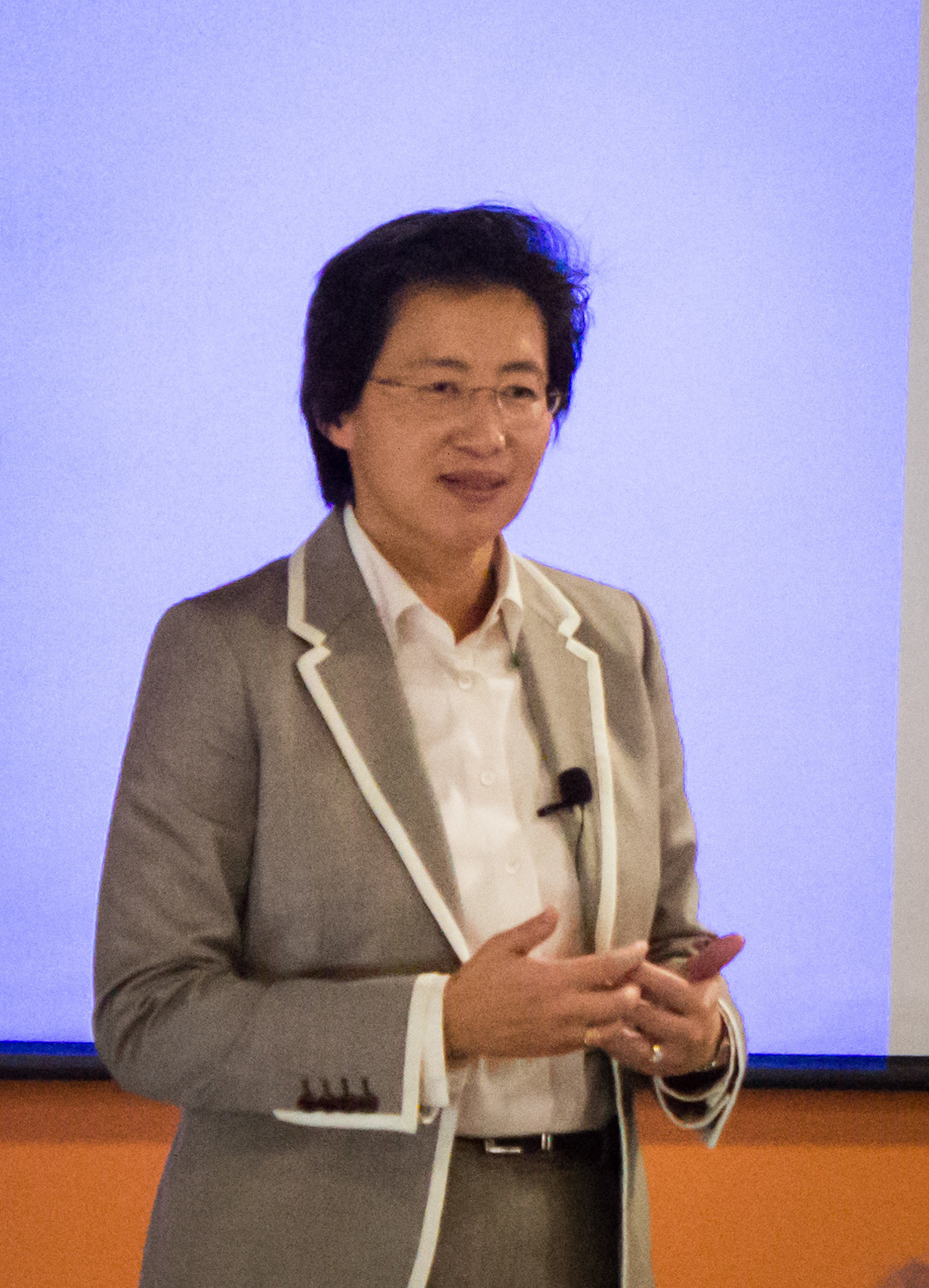
Su in November 2014

Su has been recognized with a number of awards throughout her career. In 2002, she was selected as one of the "Top 100 Young Innovators" by MIT Technology Review, and the following year the YWCA gave her an award for outstanding achievement in business. In 2009, Su was named a fellow of the Institute of Electrical and Electronics Engineers (IEEE), having published more than 40 technical articles. Su was named "2014 Executive of the Year" at the EE Times and EDN 2014 ACE Awards.

In 2015, SFGate nominated her for their inaugural Visionary of the Year award, which "salutes leaders who strive to make the world a better place and drive social and economic change by employing new, innovative business models and practices".

The next year, she was named one of the "50 Most Powerful Women in Technology" by the National Diversity Council and "Outstanding 50 Asian Americans in Business" with the Pinnacle Award by the Asia American Business Development Center.

Su was named "People to Watch" by HPCWire, "Top Ranked Semiconductor CEO", by Institutional Investor Magazine and "World's Greatest Leaders" by Fortune in 2017. Su was once again recognized by the National Diversity Council as one of the "50 Most Powerful Women in Technology".

In 2018, Su received the UPWARD "Women of the Year Award", "Lifetime Achievement Award" from the Greater Austin Asian Chamber, elected to the National Academy of Engineering, Fortune's #6 "Businessperson of the Year", Global Semiconductor Alliance "Dr. Morris Chang Exemplary Leadership Award", and Forbes America's Top 50 Women In Tech. She was also appointed as Board of Directors Chair of the Global Semiconductor Alliance.

In 2019, Su was named one of “The World's Best CEO of 2019” by Barron's, Fortune's #44 "Most Powerful Women in Business", Harvard Business Review's #26 "The Best-Performing CEOs in the World", and Bloomberg Businessweek "The Bloomberg 50".

Su was the highest-paid CEO for 2019 of any company on the S&P 500 index of the 500 largest publicly traded U.S. companies. The annual review, published by A.P. and Equilar since 2011, reported that Su received $58.5 million in 2019. The figure is mainly due to a one-off stock reward.

She was the 2020 recipient of the Semiconductor Industry Association's Robert N. Noyce Award. Also in 2020, she was elected to the American Academy of Arts and Sciences. She was the 2020 Technical Leadership Abie Award Winner. She was the recipient of the Spirit of Silicon Valley Lifetime Achievement Award from the Silicon Valley Leadership Group. She was also ranked as #2 on the Fortune Business Person of The Year. In 2020, Su was named by Carnegie Corporation of New York as an honoree of the Great Immigrants Award.

In 2021, Su was named as a member of the U.S. President's Council of Advisors on Science and Technology (PCAST) by President Joe Biden, and inducted into the Women in Technology Hall of Fame. Su was subsequently awarded the IEEE Robert N. Noyce Medal, becoming the first woman to receive this prize, and named as #49 on the Forbes 100 Most Powerful Women, credited for the 25-fold increase to AMD's stock since she became CEO in 2014. In 2022 Su was awarded the International Peace Honors Honoree "for her achievements in revolutionizing high performance computing, the donation of supercomputing power for infectious disease research, and inspiring people from all backgrounds to pursue careers in STEM".

In 2022, MIT named its new building 12, dedicated for nanotechnology research, under her name, and in 2023, Su ranked 49th in Forbes' list of "World's 100 most powerful women". She rose to tenth in 2025.

She was ranked 12th on Fortune's list of Most Powerful Women in 2023.

Su was included in Time's 2024 list of the "100 Most Influential People in AI" and in the Financial Times' list of the 25 most influential women in 2024. She was also named CEO of the Year by Time in 2024. In 2025, she was named as one of the "Architects of AI" for Time's Person of the Year.

She was reappointed to PCAST by President Donald Trump in 2026.

On November 12, 2026, Su was awarded CEO of the Year by Yahoo Finance. She received the award for turning AMD into Nvidia's strongest rival since becoming CEO in 2014, according to Yahoo Finance.

== Notes ==
Business positions
Preceded by Rory Read	CEO, AMD; 2014–present	Incumbent
