= Serge Kampf =

French businessman and entrepreneur (1934–2016)

- Born: 13 October 1934; Grenoble
- Died: 15 March 2016 (aged 81)
- Education: Double degree in law and economics

Serge Kampf (13 October 1934 – 15 March 2016) was a French entrepreneur with Swiss roots. He was the founder and long-standing managing director of Capgemini, the multinational information technology (IT) services and consulting company.

== Life ==
Kampf was born in 1934 in Grenoble and had Swiss roots.

He graduated with a double degree in law and economics and began his professional career in 1960 at the Direction générale des Télécommunications in Paris after failing to gain entry to the École nationale d'administration.

He worked at Groupe Bull, a French computer manufacturer, leaving the company in 1967. In the same year, he and three colleagues founded the company Sogeti in Grenoble.

Under his chairmanship, in 1973 Sogeti acquired a majority stake in CAP (Centre d'analyse et de Programmation), and in 1974 took over the American company Gemini Computer Systems. In 1975, the company changed its name to CAP Gemini Sogeti. Cap Gemini Sogeti has been listed on the Paris Stock Exchange since 1985 and was included in the French stock index CAC 40 in 1988.

In 2011, he became the centre of a controversy when Bilan magazine mistakenly included him in a list of wealthy French personalities who had recently settled in Switzerland.

Kampf was CEO of Cap Gemini Sogeti until 23 May 1996, and then became President. He stepped down from his position in 2012 at the age of 77. He was succeeded by Paul Hermelin.

Kampf died on 15 March 2016, at the age of 81.

== Social commitment ==
Kampf was a connoisseur and patron of French rugby union and a member of the French Académie des Sports. His companies Capgemini and Sogeti are among the most important supporters of FC Grenoble Rugby and Biarritz Olympique.

A stand at the Aguiléra sports park in Biarritz is named after him.

For many years, he also supported the French Barbarians, a French rugby team, of which he was honorary president.

He helped save the CS Bourgoin-Jallieu club from insolvency with a personal donation of 500,000 euros.

A lecture hall at the Grenoble Institute of Neuroscience is named after him to honour his donation during the construction of the building in 2006.

== Awards ==
Serge Kampf was an honorary member of FC Grenoble Rugby and Commander of the Legion of Honour.
