= Dynamic enterprise =

The Dynamic Enterprise is an Enterprise architecture concept based on Web 2.0 technology. marked by continuous and transformative growth. The dynamic enterprise is supported by a dynamic communications framework, that aims to interconnects networks, people, processes and knowledge. This concept is introduced by Alcatel-Lucent in 2008.

The Alcatel-Lucent Dynamic Communications Framework provides:

- Integration of process information and communication
- Intelligent infrastructure
- Personalized tools for collaboration

== Overview ==
Organizations face key trends that threaten their ability to grow, retain customers, and prosper. Internally, employees are faced with ever mounting volumes of information they must review and act upon, coupled with a constant need to learn and use a multitude of new and changing tools. Externally, customer service is equally demanding.

As organizations cope with this challenging environment, a new generation of employees is increasingly frustrated to find that the tools in their workplace lag behind what they are accustomed to in the consumer world. To compound the situation, market and competitive forces are constantly accelerating. These changes drive a need to transform enterprise communications–to become more dynamic.

The Dynamic Enterprise is enabled by a Dynamic Communications Framework, a concept developed by Alcatel-Lucent, that interconnects networks, people, processes and knowledge. The framework is always on, flexible, standards-based so that organizations can respond quickly to change and better harness its knowledge.

== See also ==
- Dynamic Enterprise Architecture (DYA)
- Dynamic Enterprise Modeling (DEM)
