= Hector Ruiz =

Chairman and CEO of Advanced Nanotechnology Solutions

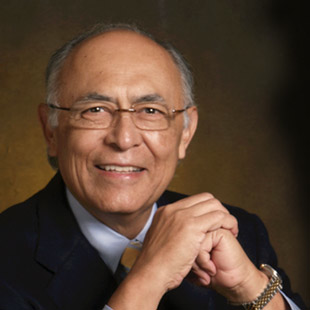
- Born: December 25, 1945 (age 80); Piedras Negras, Coahuila, Mexico
- Education: University of Texas at Austin (BS, 1968; MS, 1970); Rice University (PhD, 1973)
- Scientific career
- Fields: Electrical engineering
- Workplaces: Texas Instruments; Motorola; AMD; GlobalFoundries

Hector de Jesus Ruiz Cardenas (born December 25, 1945) is the chairman and CEO of Advanced Nanotechnology Solutions, Inc. and former CEO & executive chairman of semiconductor company Advanced Micro Devices, Inc. (AMD).

Ruiz is the author of Slingshot: AMD's Fight To Free An Industry From The Ruthless Grip Of Intel, "a book that memorializes his bet-the-company decision in 2005 to file an antitrust case against its much larger rival." The book also "elaborates on his humble upbringing as well as advice and lessons learned from relatives and teachers."

== Education ==
Ruiz was born in the border town of Piedras Negras, Coahuila, Mexico. As a teenager, he walked across the Mexico – United States border every day to attend a high school in nearby Eagle Pass, Texas, from which he graduated as valedictorian just three years after beginning to learn English. Ruiz earned a BS and MS in electrical engineering from the University of Texas at Austin in 1968 and 1970 respectively and a PhD from Rice University in 1973.

In 2012, Ruiz—along with former First Lady Laura Bush, Charles Matthews, Melinda Perrin, Julius Glickman and Admiral William H. McRaven—was named a Distinguished Alumnus of the University of Texas.

== Career ==
Ruiz worked at Texas Instruments for six years and Motorola for 22 years, rising to become president of Motorola's Semiconductor Products Sector before being recruited in 2000 by AMD founder Jerry Sanders to serve as AMD's president and chief operating officer, and to become heir apparent to lead the company upon Sanders' retirement. Ruiz succeeded Sanders in the CEO's seat in 2002, and was named chairman of the board in 2004.

Ruiz endorsed the decision to buy ATI, which led to a period of financial reverses. Ruiz survived rumors of his ouster in late 2007. However, he resigned as CEO on July 18, 2008, after AMD reported its seventh consecutive quarterly loss.

Ruiz took AMD "off death watch," according to a leading industry analyst. As CEO, Ruiz led AMD to "important technical accomplishments and strides in its competition against Intel," but " he was never able to stanch the company's persistent financial losses." Analyst Rob Enderle gives Ruiz credit for the strategy to spin off the manufacturing operations, "relieving AMD of the cost of running chip plants and allowing more focus on chip design." Ruiz was behind the deal in which an Abu Dhabi government arm funded the new venture.

According to The New York Times, "From about 2003 to 2006, A.M.D. offered a line of chips that analysts and many computer makers hailed as superior to Intel's products. Executives from A.M.D. contended that Intel blunted the adoption of these chips through its financial arrangements."

In 2010, the Federal Trade Commission settled a number of anti-competition complaints against Intel. Intel "accepted all the terms of the settlement without admitting that it had committed any anticompetitive acts." In 2009, AMD "settled its own antitrust complaint against Intel in November with Intel agreeing to pay $1.25 billion."

In February 2012, the Albany Times Union looked back at the June 2006 announcement by Ruiz and then-current New York Governor George Pataki that AMD and then its spin-off GlobalFoundries "would be building the world's most advanced 'chip fab' on the planet." The news "vault[ed] the Capital Region into the global technology spotlight virtually overnight." Pataki said GlobalFoundries is likely to end up spending $7 billion and hiring 2,000 employees at the plant, with 9,000 additional jobs created as a result.

Ruiz was named Chairman of AMD spin-off GlobalFoundries in March 2009. He resigned concurrent with reports that identified Ruiz as the previously unnamed AMD executive who allegedly discussed AMD's plans for the spin-off with an investment manager before it had been publicly disclosed. Ruiz has not been charged with any criminal activity. "There were never any allegations made against me, no one from the government side or the Justice side have ever contacted me," Ruiz told MarketWatch. Ruiz added that he even volunteered to speak with investigators. “They never took me up on it." Ruiz also said, "I strongly believe that I never have done anything wrong or inappropriate.”

Traveling globally in 2010 as an adviser to technology companies, Ruiz commented on the rise of Brazil's tech economy in a column published in the Austin American-Statesman, saying "there seems to be a new sense of confidence among Brazilian business and political leaders [and] a growing realization that Brazil's time might, at last, be now."

In July 2010 EDCO Ventures, an economic development organization, added Hector Ruiz to its board of directors.

Bloomberg News reported in June 2011 that Ruiz and another former AMD executive, Bharath Rangarajan, had formed a new consultancy called Bull Ventures. The company aims "to win business by touting his experience in leading strategy and transactions while at the chipmaker."

In March 2013, Ruiz re-entered the public debates surrounding semiconductors and the information technology industry with a column published by BusinessWeek entitled, "AMD's Former CEO Has Advice for Intel's Next CEO."

In September 2015, the Mexican Consulate in Austin, Texas, announced that it would honor Dr. Hector Ruíz with its Ohtli Award.

== Political views ==
Ruiz supports a legal path to U.S. citizenship for undocumented or unauthorized immigrants, and criticized Mark Zuckerberg's high-skilled immigration lobby efforts as elitist.

Business positions
Preceded by Jerry Sanders	CEO, AMD; 2002–2008	Succeeded by Dirk Meyer
