= Dirk Meyer =

American businessman

Derrick R. "Dirk" Meyer (born November 24, 1961) is a former chief executive officer of Advanced Micro Devices, serving in the position from July 18, 2008 to January 10, 2011.

== Education ==
He received a bachelor's degree in computer engineering from the University of Illinois at Urbana-Champaign and a master's degree in business administration from Boston University Graduate School of Management.

== Career ==
He was a co-architect of the Alpha 21064 and Alpha 21264 microprocessors during his employment at DEC and also worked at Intel in its microprocessor design group.

Meyer joined AMD in 1996, where he personally led the team that designed and developed the Athlon processor.

Meyer was formerly president and chief executive officer of AMD. At one time, he was the chief operating officer. In this role, he shared leadership and management of AMD with former Chief Executive Officer and Chairman of AMD Hector Ruiz. Prior to this role, Meyer served as president and chief operating officer of AMD’s Microprocessor Solutions Sector where he had overall responsibility for AMD’s microprocessor business, including product development, manufacturing, operations and product marketing.

On July 18, 2008, Meyer replaced Hector Ruiz as the CEO of AMD. Meyer focused the company onto the PC and data center server market. AMD announced 2010 that more than ever notebooks are hitting the market in 2010. Meyer justifies the focus by stating that an increasing mobile and consumer electronics market does not shrink the traditional market. He wanted to address these markets later, when AMD is prepared to dedicate sufficient resources to address them well. This strategy led to Bulldozer architecture for the traditional PC market and Bobcat addressing the netbook and tablet market nearly exclusively dominated by Intel, both hitting the market in 2011 and 2012.

In the beginning of 2011, Meyer was removed as CEO after discussions with the AMD Board. His departure is widely believed to have been due to conflicting views about the future strategic direction for the company. Meyer was replaced by Rory Read later in the year.

On October 10, 2012, Meyer joined the Board of Directors for startup company Ocoos.

Business positions
| Preceded by Hector Ruiz | CEO, AMD; 2008–2011 | Succeeded by Rory Read |
