= Jerry Sanders (businessman) =

American businessman; co-founder of Advanced Micro Devices

- Born: Walter Jeremiah Sanders III; September 12, 1936 (age 90); Chicago, Illinois, U.S.
- Education: University of Illinois Urbana-Champaign (BS)
- Known for: Co-founding AMD
- Spouse: Tawny Sanders (m. 1990)

Walter Jeremiah Sanders III (born September 12, 1936) is an American businessman and engineer, who was a co-founder of the semiconductor manufacturer Advanced Micro Devices (AMD), and its CEO from 1969 to 2002.

== Early life and education ==
Jerry Sanders III grew up in the South Side of Chicago, Illinois, raised by his paternal grandparents. He was once attacked and beaten by a street gang leaving him so covered in blood that a priest was called to administer the last rites. He attended the University of Illinois Urbana–Champaign on an academic scholarship from the Pullman railroad car company. He graduated from there with a Bachelor of Science degree in electrical engineering in 1958.

After graduation, Sanders worked for the Douglas Aircraft Company. He subsequently moved to Motorola, then to Fairchild Semiconductor.

== Business career ==
=== 1961–1969: Fairchild Semiconductor ===
Sanders joined Fairchild Semiconductor in 1961 as a young engineer. At Fairchild, Sanders quickly rose from lower sales positions up to a succession of management positions in marketing, making him a likely candidate for one of the company's top vice presidencies. However, in 1968, a new management team was brought into Fairchild Semiconductor by Sherman Fairchild, led by C. Lester Hogan, then vice president of Motorola Semiconductor. The staff from Motorola, also known as "Hogan's Heroes", were conservative and hence immediately clashed with Sanders' boisterous style. Sanders' flamboyant personality and style made the new management at Fairchild Semiconductor feel uneasy so they fired him. Sanders said that, on his firing from Fairchild, "My whole life has been about treating people fairly, and I wasn't treated fairly".

=== 1969–2004: Advanced Micro Devices ===
In 1969, eight engineers left Fairchild Semiconductor together to start a new company, founding Advanced Micro Devices (AMD) in Sunnyvale, California, in May 1969. They asked Jerry Sanders to join them, and he said he would, provided he became the president of the company. Although it caused some dissension within the group, they agreed, and the company was founded with Sanders as president. Every employee at the company got stock options, an innovation at the time.

Sanders gave the company a strong sales and marketing orientation so that it was successful even though it was often behind its competitors in technology and manufacturing; Stacy Rasgon, a semiconductor analyst at Bernstein Research, called Sanders "one of the best salesmen that Silicon Valley had ever seen". He shared the success of the company with the employees, usually coincident with sales-oriented growth targets.

Sanders at AMD famously remarked that in the semiconductor industry "real men have fabs". Originally intended as a jibe against competitors, Sanders's remarks have been largely disproven in the years since. From 1969 to 2009, AMD fabricated its own processors but it later sold off its foundry division as GlobalFoundries in 2009. AMD is now fabless and outsources its fabrication to GlobalFoundries and TSMC.

He steered the company through hard times as well. In 1974, a particularly bad recession almost broke the company. Through a period of stagflation in 1979, he refused to lay off AMD employees and instead took a leaf from the Japanese rather than engaging in the same rampant layoffs that had occurred at Fairchild earlier.

By 1979, Intel needed a second source to produce its 8088 processor for IBM PCs so it turned to AMD. In 1982, Sanders was responsible for a renegotiated licensing deal that would enable AMD to copy Intel's processor microcode to make its own x86 processors, a deal that eventually made the company the only real competitor to Intel. The open-ended legal language of the deal was used by Sanders to lead efforts for AMD to reverse-engineer and clone Intel's 8086 processor. Intel successfully countersued AMD which caused AMD's stock to collapse and nearly killed the company.

In 2000, Sanders recruited Héctor Ruiz, at the time the president of Motorola's Semiconductor Products Sector, to be AMD's president and CEO, and to become the heir apparent to lead the company upon Sanders' retirement. He stayed with the company as chairman after Ruiz succeeded him as CEO in 2002. Sanders stepped down as AMD chair in April 2004 after 35 years at the company.

Business positions
Preceded by Company founded	CEO, AMD; 1969–2002	Succeeded by Hector Ruiz
