= Paul Hermelin =

French businessman (born 1952)

- Born: 30 April 1952 (age 74); Etterbeek, Belgium
- Education: École Polytechnique, ÉNA
- Occupation: Chairman of Capgemini

Paul Hermelin (born April 30, 1952) is a French businessman. He was Chief Executive Officer of Capgemini from 2012 to 2020 and is chairman of the Board of Directors (since 2020).

== Early life and education ==
Paul Hermelin grew up in Avignon in the working-class district of Monclar and has Belgian roots.

He completed the preparatory classes at the Lycée Saint-Louis. Hermelin graduated from the Ecole Polytechnique in 1972 and the Ecole Nationale d’Administration (ENA) in 1978.

== Career ==
Hermelin spent the second fifteen years of his professional life in the French government, primarily in the Ministry of Finance. He started his career in Jacques Delors's Ministry of the Economy. From 1988 to 1991, he worked in Hubert Curien's Ministry of Research and Technology. From 1991 to 1993, he worked in Dominique Strauss-Kahn's Ministry of Industry and Foreign Trade as chief of staff.

Hermelin joined Capgemini in May 1993 where he was in charge of coordinating central functions. Following the merger with Ernst & Young, which he initiated, he became deputy CEO in May 2000 and was appointed as the CEO of the Capgemini Group on January 1, 2002. In May 2012, Hermelin became chairman and CEO of the Capgemini Group.

In May 2020, Aiman Ezzat succeeded Hermelin as chief executive officer and Paul Hermelin continues as chairman of the board of directors.

In January 2013, Hermelin was appointed by Minister of Foreign Affairs Laurent Fabius as France's Special Representative for Economic Relations with India. In 2014, employees of Indian nationality made up a third of the Capgemini Group's workforce i.e. almost 47,000 people.

== Other activities ==
From 1989 to 2001 and again since March 2008, he was also a municipal councilor in Avignon.

Since 2021 he has been member of the Board of Directors at Institut Montaigne.

== Remuneration ==
Paul Hermelin received €4,831,809 in 2015, which corresponded to a salary increase of 18%. Marianne magazine reports that, by comparison, the salary increases for the 22,000 French employees fell from €900,000 in 2014 to €806,000 in 2015.

His annual remuneration in 2016 amounted to €4,74 million, of which €2,53 million was fixed and €2,21 million was in the form of "performance shares".

Business positions
Preceded by Serge Kampf	CEO of Capgemini; 2012–2020	Succeeded by Aiman Ezzat
