= Rory Read =

American business executive

- Born: December 13, 1961 (age 64); Ellenville, New York
- Education: Hartwick College
- Title: President and CEO of Sprinklr (November 5, 2024)
- Spouse: Mary Savoy
- Children: 4

Rory P. Read is an American businessman and entrepreneur who is the president and CEO of Sprinklr, a software company. He was the CEO of Vonage, a position he assumed on July 1, 2020. He previously served as EVP chief operating executive at Dell as well as president and CEO of Virtustream. He was formerly the chief integration officer at Dell, with responsibility for planning the integration of Dell and EMC. From August 2011 to October 2014 he served as president and chief executive officer of AMD. He has also worked for IBM and Lenovo.

== Education ==
Read graduated magna cum laude with a bachelor's degree in information systems from Hartwick College.

== Career ==
=== IBM ===
Read spent 23 years at IBM serving in various global leadership roles. He worked in IBM's Asia Pacific region as general manager, Business Innovation Services for Asia Pacific. As managing partner for IBM's Business Consulting Services Industrial Sector, Read led the division through a turnaround that significantly improved gross margins, drove new customer acquisitions and generated double digit revenue growth and operating profitability. He was vice president of IBM eBusiness Transformation that produced more than $1 billion in company-wide savings and $21 billion in sales.

=== Lenovo ===
Read served as president and chief operating officer of Lenovo Group, Ltd. During Read's five-year tenure at Lenovo he was responsible for driving growth, execution, profitability and performance across a global $16 billion enterprise encompassing over 160 countries. At the time of Read's departure, Lenovo had just marked the seventh straight quarter as the fastest growing PC maker in the world and had become the world's third largest global PC manufacturer.

=== AMD ===
Read is the former CEO and president of AMD, where he followed Dirk Meyer. Appointed president and CEO in August, 2011, Read served on the company's board of directors. Rory was followed by Lisa Su.

At AMD, Read inherited a company that had approximately 95% of its revenue driven by the PC market. Read diversified the portfolio to produce revenue of 50% from five new high growth markets, building over US$2 billion in new businesses. Under Read, AMD lowered costs by over 30% (primarily due to employee layoffs) while restructuring AMD debt, strengthening the balance sheet, and returning to non-GAAP profitability. He was responsible for attempting to implement an ambidextrous X86/ARM architecture and the clean sweep of AMD GPUs or APUs in new game consoles during his tenure (with Nintendo being the exception).

Read also served as an executive advisor for AMD.

=== Dell / Virtustream ===
Read served as the EVP chief operating executive of Dell, and president and CEO of Virtustream, a Dell subsidiary. Read was formerly the chief integration officer at Dell, with responsibility for planning the integration of Dell and EMC. He led a cross-functional team which managed the planning of the proposed acquisition. Previously he was chief operating officer and president of worldwide commercial sales for Dell. He was responsible for Dell's global go-to-market initiatives, omni-channel sales planning and enablement.

=== Vonage ===
On June 8, 2020, Read was named the next CEO of Vonage, a business cloud communications provider. He assumed the role on July 1, 2020.

== Personal life ==
Read is married to Mary Savoy-Read, also a graduate of Hartwick College. As of 2011, the couple had four children.

Business positions
Preceded by Dirk Meyer	CEO, AMD; 2011–2014	Succeeded by Lisa Su
