= Complexity management =

Complexity management is a business methodology that deals with the analysis and optimization of complexity in enterprises.

Effective complexity management is based on four pillars: 1) alignment with the overall strategy of the company, 2) transparency over all costs and benefits of complexity, identifying the optimization benefits, 3) related measures and managing the trade-offs between parts of the total value chain (the totality of all the company's activities), and 4) sustainable infrastructure such as IT tools, incentives and processes.

Complexity management has benefited from technology, leading to detailed analysis and simulation of complexity, optimization measures, and their effects down the value chain.

== Fields of complexity in enterprises ==
Complexity appears in the following fields:

- Product portfolio: number and type of products, features and services sold to the customer base (e.g. SKUs)
- Markets/segments: number and type of market segments in the respective countries/regions served
- Customer portfolio: number and variety of all customers served (including customer accounts and ship-to customers)
- Material/components: Variety of raw materials, components and services used in value generation
- IT systems: Variety and type of systems and applications
- Organization: Company organization, structures and governance
- Processes: Number and type of processes in the enterprise
- Production/Supply chain: Production plants and network, manufacturing processes, asset base, distribution
- Technologies: R&D platforms and project portfolio and product technologies involved

Complexity in enterprises is driven by:

- Market volatility: changing market conditions like raw material supply and sales volumes drive business process complexity
- Fragmented customer demands drive product portfolio and feature complexity
- Globalization drives complexity of served markets and company locations
- Mergers & acquisitions drive complexity in all fields
- Silo-oriented cultures drive complexity in organization, IT systems and business processes
- Increasing customer pressure drives complexity in product portfolio and features

== Approach ==
Constant complexity management can result in a significant profitability increase of an enterprise. According to The Global Simplicity Index, the world's largest companies are on average losing more than $1 billion each due to unnecessary complexity. Reducing complexity requires subsequent activities around the four pillars: strategy, transparency, total value chain and sustainability.

=== Strategy ===
The relevance of complexity for the success of a given business model is being evaluated. If complexity has an important role for the success of an enterprise it needs to be embedded in the corporate strategy.

=== Transparency ===
Fact based transparency over the costs of complexity as well as its value is created along the entire value chain. The structure of complexity is analyzed and visualized by using tools such as variant trees or complexity funnels. Quantitative transparency regarding true contribution is established by a pragmatic activity-based costing effort. "Good complexity" (value adding) is distinguished from "bad complexity" (costly complexity not paid by the customer). Value-adding/good complexity is to be efficiently managed and possibly increased whereas excessive costly/bad complexity is to be minimized.

=== Total value chain ===
Based on the defined strategy and the achieved transparency, the optimal complexity is identified for each of the fields within the enterprise. Measures to optimize complexity into the target status are defined and related qualitative (e.g. improved time to market) and quantitative (lower cost) benefits are determined. At this time it becomes critical to actively manage the change and trade-offs between the value chain functions (such as R&D, procurement, manufacturing, logistics, and marketing & sales), so that the overall company-wide optimum can be achieved.

=== Sustainability ===
To make the achieved advantages and the overall optimum sustainable, an appropriate infrastructure for complexity management needs to be established. This infrastructure comprises IT systems and applications (e.g. optimized cost accounting and reporting), rules, KPIs, incentive schemes, a stringent organization and reengineered processes.

=== Complexity hiding ===
To manage complex systems, the desire of intelligibility and the need of teachability have to be coped with. The direct approach with cutting the complex into pieces will fail, when overview on structure and contents get lost on the path to full explanation. A promising approach to ensure success is the nested layering of the systems description with a staggered approach to disclosing the details. That appears as a temporary hiding of the last degree of detailing, as long as the further detailing gets omitted or unasked. Hence in all cases the complexity hiding approach requires reasonable patience with the trainees and endurance with the trainers.
