= CEFAM =

- Type: Private
- Established: 1986
- Dean: Karine CHAUX
- Location: Lyon, Rhône Alpes, France
- Campus: Urban
- Website: www.cefam.fr

The Centre d'Études Franco-Américain de Management (or the Franco-American Center for Management Studies), commonly known CEFAM is an international business school located in Lyon, France. It specializes in management, finance, consulting, and marketing.

Established in 1986, this private school offers undergraduate and graduate business degrees based on the American education system.

CEFAM is accessible to students immediately after high school graduation. It allows them to study in an English language environment and experience American culture without leaving France. Lectures are taught almost exclusively in English - an exception exists for mathematics - by native speakers with strong academic backgrounds and industry experience.

CEFAM's programs consist of a bachelor's degree in three years in France and a year overseas in one of the American partner universities and an MBA over two years, the first in France and the second in the USA. Both the BBA and MBA programs offer a double diploma, including a French diploma certified "Niveau 7"(Master's degree level) by the French government and an AACSB accredited American degree.

The school also offers a study abroad program, which allows American students from partner universities to study in France for a semester or a year.

== Campus ==
CEFAM's first campus was located at 107 Rue de Marseille in Lyon. In 2004, it moved to the International Professional University René Cassin (UPIL) campus in Lyon. CEFAM also maintains an extensive e-campus for students studying in Lyon and elsewhere in Europe or the United States.

== Programs ==
=== Bachelor of Business Administration ===
CEFAM's undergraduate program offers an international business education right after graduating high school. All classes are taught in English, allowing French students to become bilingual over the years. During the first three years of the Bachelor of Business Administration, students are based in Lyon. For the fourth and final year of the BBA, students study at one of the school's partner universities, where they will graduate and receive an American degree. Students also receive a French degree certified Niveau 7 by the French government. Students are also required to do two internships before graduating. A three-month internship by the end of the first year and a six-month internship by the end of the second year.

=== Master of Business Administration ===
CEFAM also offers the possibility to access an MBA program with the first year in France and the second year in one of the following AACSB accredited American universities: Siena College, La Salle University, Monmouth University, or The University of Mary Washington.

== Partner Universities ==
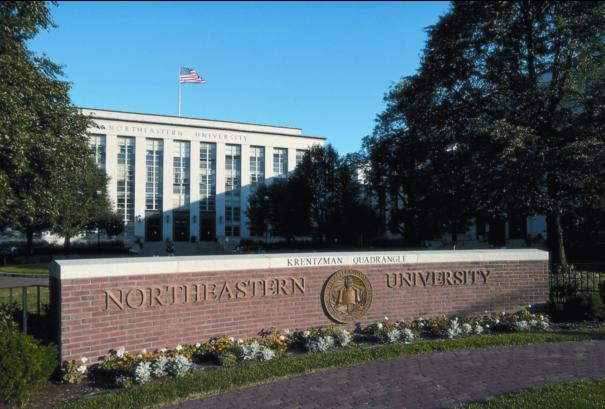
Northeastern's historic Ell Hall on Huntington Avenue

Current

- Pace University, New York, NY. AACSB accredited
- Siena College, Loudonville, NY. AACSB accredited
- Temple University, Philadelphia, PA. AACSB accredited
- Rider University, Lawrenceville, NJ. AACSB accredited
- Northeastern University, Boston, MA. AACSB accredited

Previous

- Old Dominion University
- Kean University
- Valparaiso University
- Universite Laval
