= Kanbay =

Former information technology services firm

Kanbay International, Inc.
- Company type: Subsidiary
- Traded as: Nasdaq: KBAY
- Industry: Information technology
- Founded: 1989; 37 years ago
- Defunct: 2006
- Fate: Acquired by Capgemini
- Headquarters: Chicago; Pune; Hyderabad; Chennai
- Key people: Raymond Spencer (chairman)
- Revenue: US$ 230.5 million
- Number of employees: 6500 (2006)
- Website: www.kanbay.com

Kanbay International, Inc. was an Indian-based global information technology (IT) services firm with approximately 6900 associates worldwide that later created a second Headquarters in the United States. Founded in 1989, the organization offered management consulting, technology integration, application development, and outsourcing strategies. Kanbay is now a division of Capgemini under the name Financial Services Strategic Business Unit (FS-SBU).

== History ==
=== Kanbay ===
Kanbay was founded in 1989 by Raymond Spencer of Australia, John Patterson of Canada, and Dileep Nath of India. All three had worked together in the late 1980s at the Institute of Cultural Affairs, a nonprofit in Maharashtra. Spencer lived in Chicago at the time when Kanbay was established, and headquarters were placed there. In September 1998, venture capital firm Safeguard Scientifics, Inc. acquired an interest in Kanbay, equating to roughly 25 percent. Revenues for Kanbay in 1999 were $44.2 million. In October 2000, Kanbay entered into the Australian market with the acquisition of Megatec, an Australian distributor. Megatec was a $15 million Melbourne, Australia-based ebusiness products and solutions firm. In the summer of 2001, Kanbay announced its ISO 9001 certification. By the end of 2003, major clients included Household International, HSBC Group, Morgan Stanley, CitiFinancial, Development Bank of Singapore, ABN-AMRO and Sun Life Financial. Revenues in 2003 were $107.2 million, with net income of $11.4 million.

=== Kanbay International ===
Kanbay International became a publicly traded company in July 2004, listing on the NASDAQ and raised $93 million under the symbol KBAY. In early 2005, the company acquired Accurum in New York, an IT services provider to the capital markets industry. In 2005 HSBC Holdings and Morgan Stanley accounted for around 60 percent of the $230.5 million in revenue the company earned. In early 2006, Kanbay acquired Adjoined Consulting a professional services firm. In particular, Adjoined offered formal management consulting and added its ERP implementation capability to Kanbay.

=== Capgemini division ===
On October 27, 2006, Capgemini agreed to acquire Kanbay International for $1.25 billion. Capgemini India's CEO stated that the merger was intended to help Capgemini grow in India and boost its services delivery there. It was reported that the deal would close at the beginning of 2007, after final approval for shareholders and anti-trust clearance. Kanbay is now a division of Capgemini under the name FS-GBU (Financial Services Global Business Unit).

== Facilities and employees ==
In September 2001 Kanbay established an office in Tokyo. Kanbay inaugurated its technology center in Pune, India in October 2001. By 2004, Kanbay had regional offices located in eight countries, as well as delivery centers in Pune and Hyderabad, India. Kanbay also owned a 49.0% interest in SSS Holdings Corporation Limited (SSS) in England. By October 2006, Kanbay International remained headquartered in the United States in Rosemont, Illinois, also reported as Chicago. It had around 6,900 staff, the majority of which were in India. as 5,000 of 7,000 employees worked in software development centers in Pune, Madras, and Hyderabad.

== Software and services ==
Focused on the financial services industry, as of 2001, Computerworld wrote that "Kanbay uses a global delivery network, called GlobalLink, to provide its clients access to resources worldwide, especially systems development and support skills."

Wrote Forbes in 2006, "Kanbay's clients include businesses in financial services, consumer and industrial products and the communications industry. The company provides management consulting, technology integration, and maintenance and outsourcing services."

According to a Bloomberg profile on the Indian division, "the company focuses in the areas of credit cards and payment systems, life insurance, health and property consultancy, banks, and other lending systems and securities. It provides software and services for banking and insurance, credit cards, and credit-related activities."

== See also ==
- Software industry in Telangana
