= Virtustream =

Cloud computing management software provider

Virtustream Inc.
- Type: Subsidiary
- Industry: Cloud computing
- Founded: 2009; 17 years ago
- Founder: Rodney Rogers; Kevin Reid
- Headquarters: 8444 Westpark Drive; Suite 900; McLean, Virginia 22012
- Area served: Worldwide
- Key people: Todd Pavone (president & CEO); Chris Ewart (CFO); Drew Fassett (SVP, Global Sales); Nina Hargus (SVP, Chief Marketing Officer)
- Products: Infrastructure as a service
- Parent: Dell Technologies
- Website: virtustream.com

Virtustream Inc. was a provider of cloud computing management software, infrastructure as a service ("IaaS") and managed services to enterprises, governments and service providers. It was a subsidiary of Dell Technologies.

== Offices ==
Virtustream was headquartered in Round Rock, TX, with offices in, Bangalore, Draper, Hopkinton, MA, Frankfurt, Kaunas, London, and Sofia, Virtustream's global infrastructure included data centers located in Frankfurt, Japan, London, Paris, San Francisco, Seoul, Sydney, Las Vegas, Washington D.C., Chicago, and Virginia.

== History ==
Virtustream was founded in 2009. The company raised approximately $40 million in series A funding from Columbia Capital, Blue Lagoon Capital, Intel Capital, Noro-Moseley Partners and TDF Ventures between September 2009 and May 2010, and $15 million in series B funding in July 2011 from Intel Capital, Columbia Capital, Noro-Moseley Partners, QuestMark Capital and TDF Ventures.

On May 26, 2015, EMC Corporation announced an agreement to acquire Virtustream and the deal was completed on July 9, 2015. Following Virtustream’s acquisition by EMC, on October 12, 2015, Dell Inc. announced it would acquire EMC in a cash-and-stock deal valued at $67 billion—the largest-ever acquisition in the technology industry. The merger closed on September 7, 2016, with EMC being renamed to Dell EMC as a result, and eventually renamed as Dell Technologies. Dell Technologies became the world’s largest privately controlled tech company at the time.

On October 12, 2015, Fortune reported, “Overall, the deal values EMC around 27% higher than where it was trading before news of Dell’s interest first broke last week. It would be the second-largest tech merger ever, behind only the $106 billion tie-up between AOL and Time Warner in 2000, and the largest-ever take-private transaction for a tech company.”

On May 7, 2018, it was announced that Virtustream's founders, Rodney J. Rogers and Kevin Reid, had decided to leave the company. Rory Read became the president of Virtustream, while retaining his position as chief operating executive of Dell Technologies. Deepak Patil, formerly of Microsoft Azure, became the senior vice president of Product and Technology. In August 2019, Patil left Virtustream to lead Dell's cloud business. In June 2020, Read left Virtustream to become CEO of Vonage. Todd Pavone, who had been president of Dell EMC’s Global Consulting business, was named to succeed Read as Virtustream's president.

== See also ==
- Enterprise Cloud Computing
