= Open Infrastructure Architecture method =

The Open Infrastructure Architecture method, or OIAm, is an open standard for the application of architecture to infrastructure.

== OIAm and the community ==
The development of the method has from its early inception been published on the Internet under a Creative Commons license, using a Semantic MediaWiki based wiki for publication of standard content - originally the "DYA|Infrastructure Repository" (DIR), currently the "Open Infrastructure Architecture repository" (OIAr). As a result of this, a community evolved consisting of architects and other people working with, or being interested in, the method. This community mainly revolves around the aforementioned OIAr, a LinkedIn group named Open Infrastructure Architecture, and a semi-annual community meeting.

== Modelling infrastructure under OIAm ==
Modelling infrastructure is done under OIAm using

- The ArchiMate architecture modelling language;
- A generic vocabulary, published under the CC-BY-SA 3.0 license in a wiki designated the OIAr (Open Infrastructure Architecture repository), based on Semantic MediaWiki;
- A workflow inspired by the work by Gerrit Blaauw
