= Capgemini =

French multinational corporation

Capgemini SE

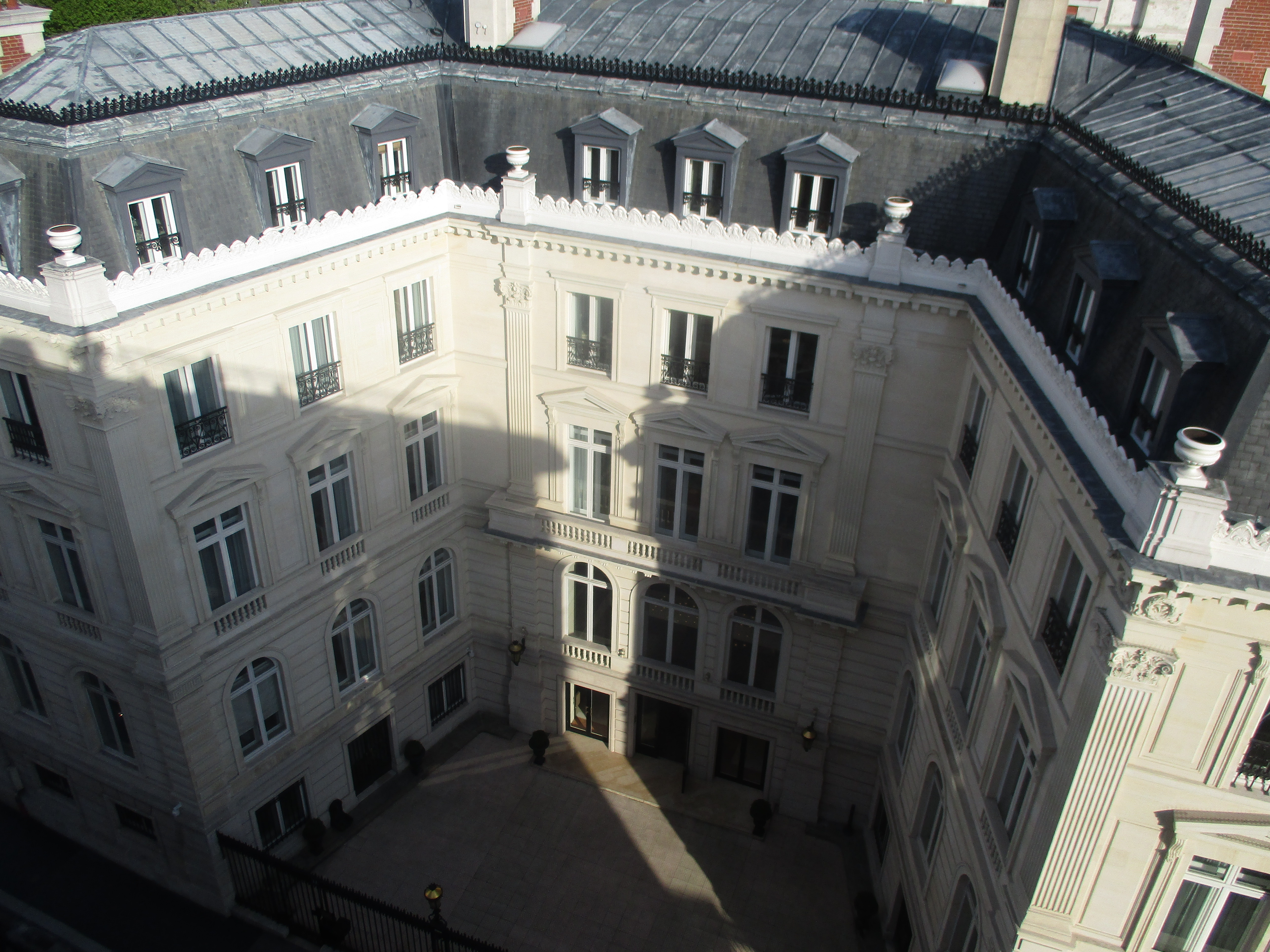
- Headquarters at 11 rue de Tilsitt near place de l'Étoile, Paris
- Type: Public
- Traded as: Euronext Paris: CAP; CAC 40 component
- ISIN: FR0000125338
- Industry: Information technology Consulting; Outsourcing
- Founded: 1 October 1967; 59 years ago
- Founder: Serge Kampf
- Headquarters: Paris, France
- Area served: Worldwide
- Key people: Aiman Ezzat (CEO); Paul Hermelin (chairman of the board)
- Revenue: ▲€22.465 billion (2025)
- Operating income: ▼€2.199 billion (2025)
- Net income: ▼€1.601 billion (2025)
- Total assets: ▲€29.060 billion (2025)
- Total equity: ▲€11.672 billion (2025)
- Number of employees: 423,400 (2025)
- Subsidiaries: Sogeti; Capgemini Engineering frog Cambridge Consultants; Synapse Product Development
- Website: www.capgemini.com

Capgemini SE is a French multinational information technology (IT) services and consulting company. It is headquartered in Paris, France. The business was established as the Société pour la Gestion de l'Entreprise et le Traitement de l'Information (Sogeti) by Serge Kampf in 1974. It adopted the name CAP Gemini Sogeti in 1975, shortly after it acquired the Centre d'Analyse et de Programmation (CAP) and Gemini Computer Systems. The company expanded considerably during the early 1980s, often via the acquisition of other companies.

In 1996, the simplified name Cap Gemini was adopted by the firm. In March 2000, at the height of the dot-com bubble, Cap Gemini purchased Ernst & Young Consulting for roughly $11 billion; the early 2000s proved to be fiscally challenging for the company, compelling it to sell off its North American consulting wing and to restructure its operations. During the mid-to-late 2000s, Cap Gemini embraced offshoring via the expansion of its presence in India, which included the purchase of both Kanbay and Thesys.

In 2015, Cap Gemini acquired the US-based technology and services company iGate for $4 billion. Two years later, the business was reorganised as Capgemini SE. In June 2019, Capgemini acquired the engineering specialist Altran, from which it formed Capgemini Engineering. By the end of the 2010s, Capgemini held over one hundred active contracts with various bodies of the French government. In July 2025, it purchased the technology outsourcing firm WNS Global Services for $3.3 billion. During the 2020s, the company placed considerable resources into the development of quantum computing and generative AI. In February 2026, Capgemini announced plans to sell its US subsidiary, Capgemini Government Solutions, amid public outcry concerning its contract to provide skiptracing services to US Immigration and Customs Enforcement (ICE).

== History ==
In 1967, the French entrepreneur Serge Kampf founded the Société pour la Gestion de l'Entreprise et le Traitement de l'Information (Sogeti), as an enterprise management and data processing company.

In 1974, Sogeti acquired the American company Gemini Computer Systems. In 1975, having acquired both the French software company Centre d'Analyse et de Programmation (CAP) and Gemini Computer Systems, and having resolved a dispute with the similarly named CAP UK over the international use of the name 'CAP', Sogeti renamed itself as CAP Gemini Sogeti.

In 1981, Cap Gemini Sogeti launched operations in the US, following the acquisition of the Milwaukee-based company DASD Corporation, which specialised in data conversion and employed 500 people in 20 branches throughout the US. Following this transaction, the US Operation was rebranded as Cap Gemini DASD.

In 1990, Cap Gemini Sogeti acquired the Hoskyns Group, a major IT outsourcing and managed services company in the UK. In 1996, the company's name was simplified to Cap Gemini, and the firm launched a new group logo. All operating companies worldwide were re-branded to operate as Cap Gemini.

In March 2000, Cap Gemini bought Ernst & Young Consulting in exchange for around $11 billion, after which it was integrated with Gemini Consulting to form Cap Gemini Ernst & Young. The valuation of this purchase had been inflated by the dot-com bubble that disruptively ended later that same year; in 2001 alone, Cap Gemini's share value dropped by 53 percent while operating losses were recorded during the following year.

During 2003, the company underwent restructuring, reducing its 13 disciplines to four broad ones: consulting, technology services, local professional services, and outsourcing. It also became increasingly focused on offshoring and outsourcing opportunities, while also opting to divest its North American consultancy arm to Accenture. In 2006, Cap Gemini acquired Kanbay for $1.25 billion, which expanded its footprint and capabilities in India. In 2008, the company acquired four former divisions of the Dutch IT company Getronics. In September 2010, Cap Gemini acquired a controlling stake in the Brazilian IT services provider CPM Braxis. That same year, it acquired the Indian IT services specialist Thesys. In April 2015, it acquired the US-based technology and services company iGate for $4 billion. In June 2017, Cap Gemini S.A. became Capgemini SE, and its Euronext ticker name similarly changed from CAP GEMINI to CAPGEMINI.

In February 2018, the company purchased the Philadelphia-based digital customer engagement company LiquidHub for US$500 million to assist Capgemini's digital and cloud growth in North America. In June 2019, Capgemini acquired Altran, a provider of engineering and R&D services. It was the largest acquisition in the company's history, bringing Capgemini's total employee count to over 250,000. As part of the acquisition, Capgemini acquired frog design and Cambridge Consultants, which were integrated into Capgemini Invent; several other recent acquisitions, including staff from Fahrenheit 212, Idean, and June21, have been merged into that group and operate under the frog brand. In 2021, Capgemini grouped the engineering and R&D activities of the Altran brand with Capgemini Digital Engineering Services and formed a new division, Capgemini Engineering.

In June 2021, Capgemini partnered with Sanofi, Orange and Generali to launch Future4care, a European start-up accelerator focused on digital healthcare. In 2021, Capgemini acquired RXP Services and Acclimation in Australia to expand its operations in Australia. Also in 2021, Capgemini acquired Australian company Empired and its New Zealand subsidiary Intergen. In January 2022, the company set up an international quantum computing laboratory, called Capgemini Quantum Lab or Capgemini Q-Lab, in collaboration with IBM. It can be used by Capgemini's clients to build in-house quantum computing applications and licensable technologies. In July 2022, it was reported that Capgemini had, via roughly 250 separate contracts between itself and various elements of the French state, allegedly been paid €1.1 billion by the French government between 2017 and 2022, operating across areas such as the economy, the armed forces, health, the environment, national education, the interior, foreign affairs, labor, agriculture, and culture. In August 2023, Capgemini announced that it was launching its own generative AI offerings.

In 2024, Capgemini acquired the enterprise data management company Syniti, which specialised in data quality, data migration, and regulatory compliance. That same year, it secured a contract worth up to £574 million to run legacy tax management systems for His Majesty's Revenue & Customs. In July 2025, Capgemini acquired technology outsourcing firm WNS Global Services in a $3.3 billion cash deal. The transaction expanded the range of Capgemini's generative AI-based products. In November of that year, it completed its purchase of managed services provider Cloud4C. As of 2025, the company has over 423,400 employees in approximately 50 countries. In March 2026, the company partnered with the US firm OpenAI for the latter's platform for building, deploying, and managing AI coworkers.

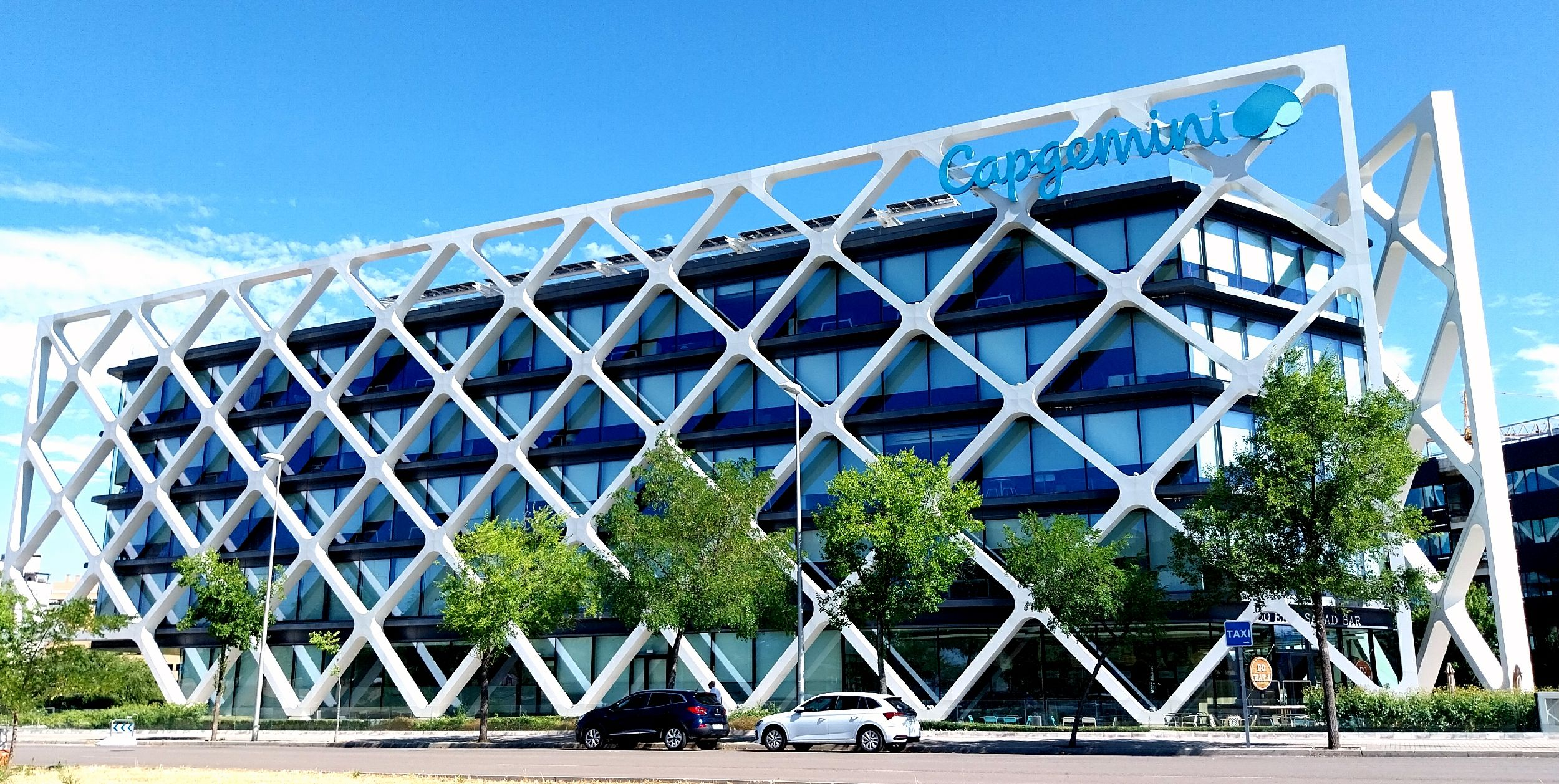
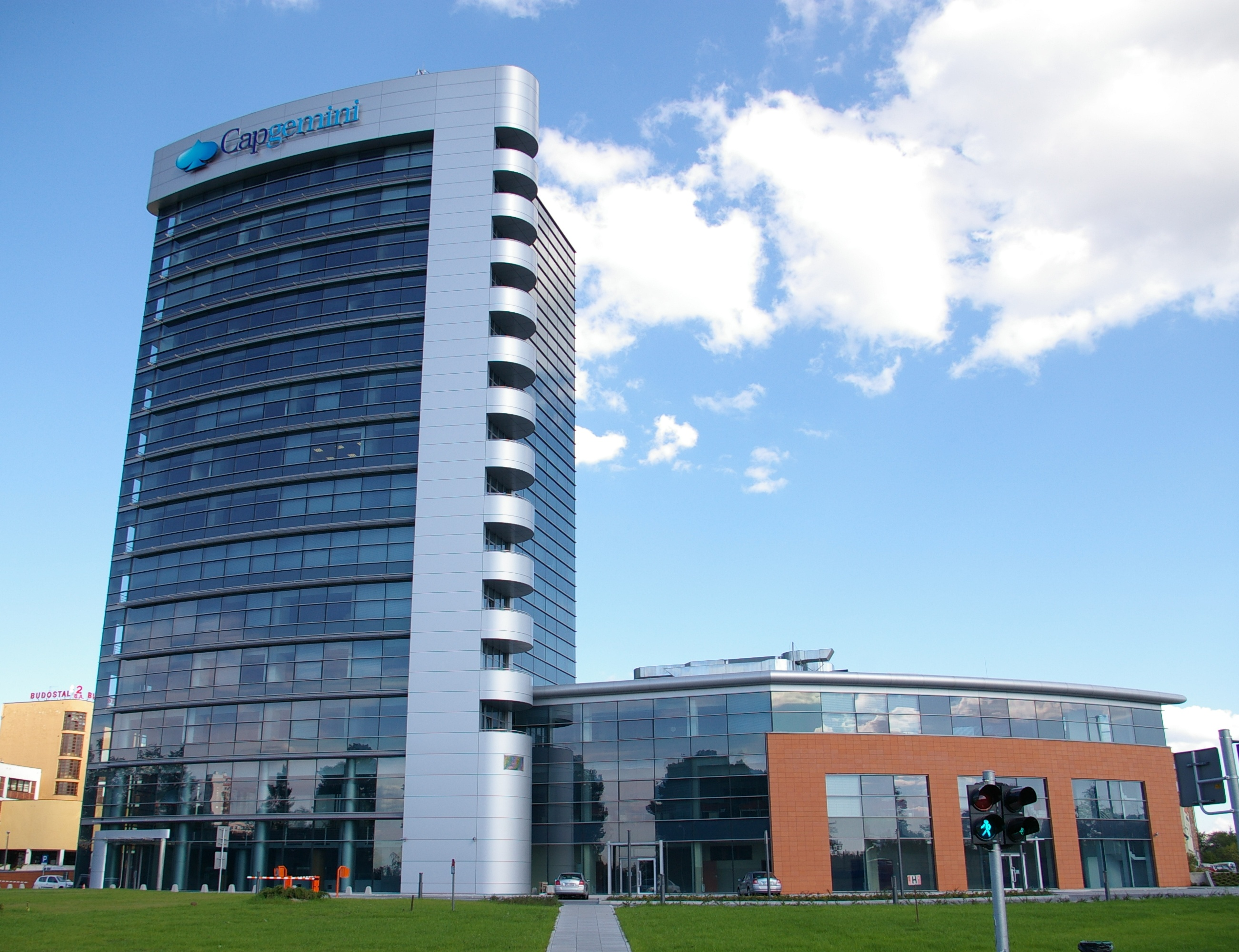
Capgemini office in Madrid, Spain and Kraków, Poland.

== Subdivisions ==
=== Sogeti ===
Sogeti is a wholly owned subsidiary of Capgemini Group, spun off in 2002. It is an information technology consulting company specialising in technology and engineering professional services.

=== Capgemini Research Institute ===
Capgemini Research Institute is the company's in-house think tank, launched in 2012. It produces reports on current trends and concerns in business and technology, based on research, data, and surveys.

=== Applied Innovation Exchange ===
Applied Innovation Exchange (AIE) is Capgemini's network of innovation labs, and was launched in 2016. The labs enable clients to exchange with designers, industry experts, business and technology partners, research organizations, and startups, and Capgemini has AIEs worldwide.

=== Capgemini Invent ===
Capgemini Invent was launched in 2018 as the design and consulting subdivision of the Capgemini Group. It is the rebranding and enlargement of Capgemini Consulting. As of 2023, the subdivision had approximately 10,000 employees in 60 locations worldwide. These include staff from frog design, Fahrenheit 212, Idean, and June21.

=== Capgemini Engineering ===
In 2021, Capgemini grouped the engineering and R&D activities of its Altran brand with Capgemini Digital Engineering Services into Capgemini Engineering.

== Controversies ==
=== Tax optimization ===
Capgemini reportedly paid no corporate tax between 2011 and 2020 despite generating €329 million in revenue in France in 2022, according to a Senate report, which calls it "a caricatured example of tax optimization". The appendices to the Senate inquiry report note in particular that Capgemini secured some €7.6 million in various contracts from the French Ministry of Finance between 2018 and 2021. Furthermore, while Capgemini was supposed to be fined €17.3 million, it obtained a rebate reducing the bill to €3.9 million with the withdrawal of adjustments for the years between 2009 and 2014.

=== Collaboration with ICE ===
Capgemini is a long-standing partner of US Immigration and Customs Enforcement (ICE), with contracts, often worth tens of millions of dollars, dating back to at least 2007. The services range from IT support to "detention planning". The company advertised this partnership in the "customer stories" section of its website, boasting that "the Capgemini team works closely to help [ICE] minimize the time and cost required to deport all deportable illegal aliens from the United States".

In November 2025, Capgemini responded to and accepted a new call for tenders to help ICE identify and locate foreigners. The French company was awarded the largest share of the contract, earning some $365 million, with revenue indexed to performance and financial bonuses based on the success rate in verifying the addresses of foreigners. Although the company initially chose to publicize this partnership on its website, all references to it were removed less than a week after journalistic publications on the topic.

In February 2026, Capgemini announced plans to immediately sell its US subsidiary, Capgemini Government Solutions. This came after a public outcry concerning its contract to provide "skip tracing services for enforcement and removal operations" for ICE, which was questioned by finance minister Roland Lescure and condemned by opposition MP Hadrien Clouet. Capgemini determined that the legal restrictions imposed for contracting with federal government entities carrying out classified activities in the United States (including a Special Security Agreement) did not allow it to exercise appropriate control over the subsidiary's operations.

== Management ==
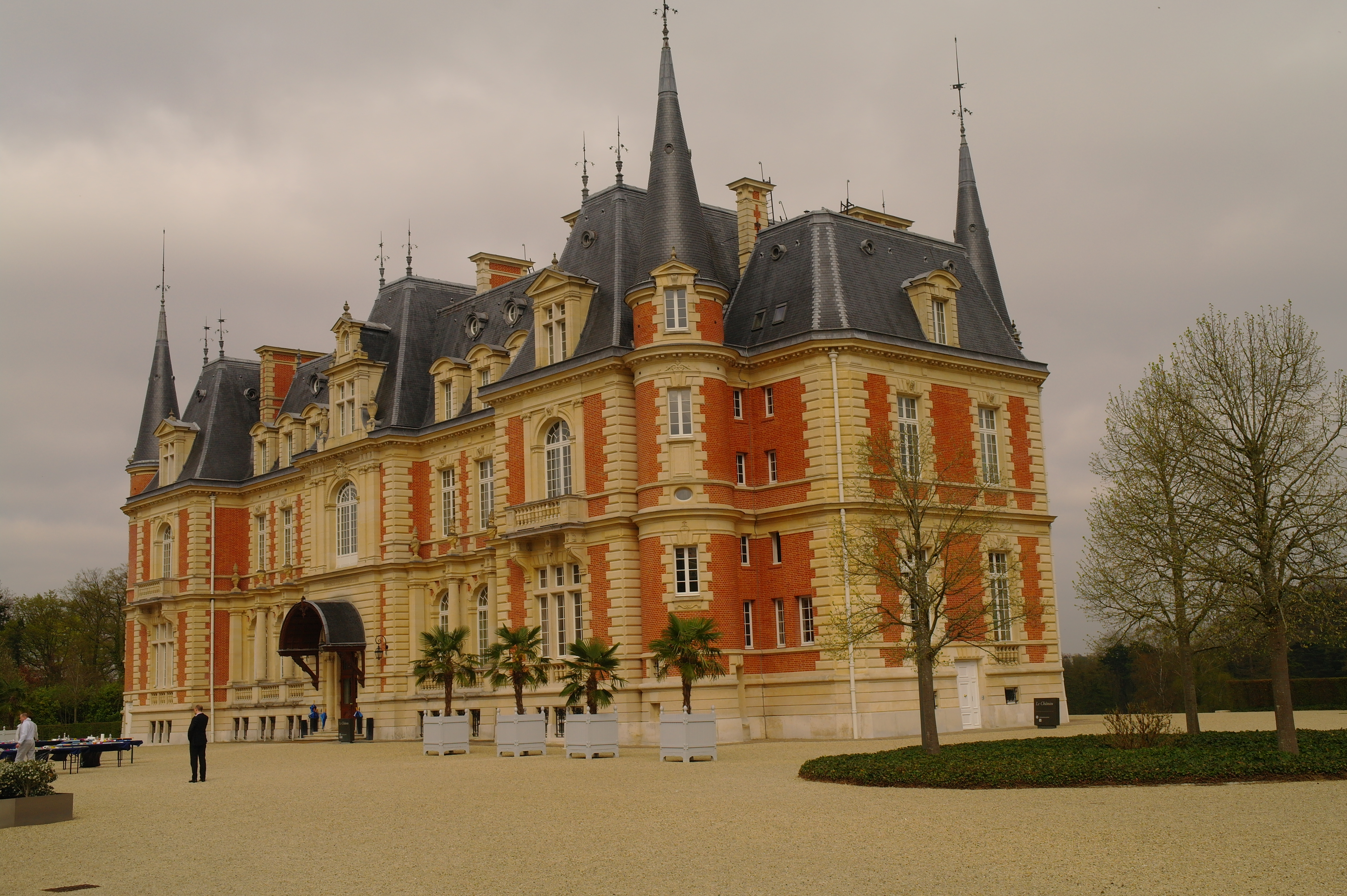
The Château des Fontaines, Chantillly, is used by Capgemini as a conference centre.

The Capgemini Group Executive Committee consists of 34 members. Aiman Ezzat has been the group's CEO since 2020, having been at the company for more than 20 years, including as COO from 2018 to 2020 and CFO from 2012 to 2018.

Paul Hermelin is chairman of the company's board of directors. He was chairman and CEO from 2012 to 2020, having been appointed CEO in 2002 and having been at the company since 1993. Hermelin succeeded Serge Kampf, the founder and prior head of the company, who stepped down in 2012, thereafter serving as vice chairman of the board until his death in 2016.

== Finances ==
	2016	2017	2018	2019	2020	2021	2022	2023	2024	2025
Total revenue (€ bn)	12.5	12.8	13.2	14.1	15.9	18.2	22.0	22.5	22.1	22.5
Operating profit (€ bn)	1.3	1.3	1.4	1.5	1.6	2.1	2.6	2.6	2.5	2.5
Net profit (€ bn)	0.9	0.8	0.7	0.9	1.0	1.2	1.6	1.7	1.7	1.6
Total assets (€ bn)	16.5	16.0	16.5	18.1	22.0	24.0	25.5	24.7	25.7	29.1
Total equity (€ bn)	7.3	7.0	7.5	8.4	6.1	8.5	9.7	10.5	11.8	11.7
Employees	193,000	200,000	211,000	219,000	270,000	325,000	360,000	340,000	341,000	423,000
