= TV Guide Plus =

Discontinued electronic program guide service

- Developer: Gemstar-TV Guide International (later Rovi Corporation)
- Initial release: mid‑1990s (analog), 2006 (digital)
- Operating system: Embedded in OEM firmware
- Platform: Televisions, DVD recorders, DVRs, and other digital television tuners
- Successor: OEM/MVPD software, PSIP, DVB-SI, and other DTV protocols
- Type: Electronic program guide
- License: Proprietary

TV Guide Plus, TV Guide Plus+, TV Guide On Screen, (in North America), Guide Plus+ (in Europe), and G-Guide (in Japan), were brand names for an interactive electronic program guide (EPG) system incorporated into a range of consumer electronics products, including televisions, DVD recorders, digital video recorders (DVR), and other digital television devices. The service provided on‑screen program listings that allowed viewers to navigate, sort, select, and schedule television programming for viewing and recording.

Although marketed under the TV Guide name, the on‑screen service was separate from the long‑running TV Guide magazine. Gemstar acquired the magazine in 1999 to align its electronic listings with the established print brand, but after Rovi purchased Gemstar in 2008 the magazine was sold off to OpenGate Capital and is operated independently. The on‑screen system itself passed to Rovi Corporation, which later acquired TiVo Inc. in 2016 and adopted the TiVo (now Xperi) name. The service was discontinued between 2012 and the start of 2017, following an abrupt cutoff of programing data in North America and a gradual withdrawal of support worldwide.

== History ==
The system was first introduced in the United States and Japan during the mid‑1990s, before expanding into European markets in the following decade. By the early 2000s, it was available through broadcast and MVPD operators in Canada, France, Germany, Spain, the United Kingdom, Austria, Switzerland, the Netherlands, Belgium, and Italy.

By the late 2000s, Rovi also became known for defending its program guide technology in court. The company brought cases against services such as Hulu and later Netflix, arguing that their on‑screen menus copied features of the TV Guide system. Several of these claims were later rejected by U.S. judges, narrowing the scope of Rovi's patents.

While those disputes played out, the on‑screen guide service itself was entering a period of decline. Rovi began winding down broadcast data in North America in 2012 with support being rapidly dropped from new televisions and DVRs soon after. Most devices on the continent had lost all EPG access by spring 2013, and Eurasian versions were gradually withdrawn over the next few years. Official notices confirmed the service's end by the beginning of 2017, which marked the conclusion of its two decade long history.

== Technical overview ==
A number of major consumer electronics manufacturers offered compatible devices including, Channel Master, JVC, Panasonic, Thomson (under the RCA, GE, and ProScan brands), Samsung, Sharp, Sony, LG, and Toshiba. Because the system was advertiser supported, program listings were distributed free to viewers, regardless of whether they received signals via terrestrial, cable, or satellite.

Gemstar also developed EPG software for personal computers, which was bundled with ATI Technologies analog NTSC tuner cards, including the TV Wonder and All-in-Wonder series. With the transition to digital broadcasting, ATI partnered with TitanTV to provide listings for its ATSC tuner cards.

The original analog implementation transmitted data through the vertical blanking interval (VBI) lines, usually 11–18, 20, and 22, of participating television stations, in a manner similar to closed captioning and teletext. This took up to 24 hours to download on the initial setup, because the information was delivered at low bitrate. By the mid‑2000s, the service had transitioned to digital using out‑of‑band data channels, which relied on a vendor licensed feed that supplied expanded program descriptions and advertising metadata.

== Digital television ==
The digital version of the service was first introduced in the mid‑2000s, beginning in the United States in 2006 alongside the rollout of the ATSC. Other regions also moved from analog to digital TV, adopting systems such as DVB-T/T2 in Europe and ISDB in Japan. In markets where the service was supported, it offered a consistent interface across different brands of televisions and recorders. In the United States, the federally mandated digital transition on June 12, 2009, rendered some older receivers and recorders unable to access listings.

At the same time, the Program and System Information Protocol (PSIP) became the standard method for U.S. broadcasters to transmit basic EPG data within ATSC signals. The Federal Communications Commission continues to require full power television stations, unlike MVPD providers, to supply PSIP information. While implementation has varied and some stations provide incomplete listings, PSIP remains in use as the main program guide system for ATSC 1 broadcasts.

Unlike PSIP, which offers only limited program details, the TV Guide system was licensed separately to manufacturers. Device makers paid royalties to Rovi to embed the software, which in turn provided a more comprehensive guide resembling the functionality of digital satellite and cable platforms, including multi‑day listings and DVR features.

With the introduction of ATSC 3.0 (branded NextGen TV), PSIP continues to serve legacy ATSC broadcasts, while its functions are being supplemented by new signaling and EPG protocols such as the Service List Table (SLT). In Europe and several other regions, the comparable digital terrestrial standard is DVB-T2, which uses the DVB Service Information (DVB‑SI) framework to deliver EPG data.

== See also ==
- TV Guide
- PSIP
- DVB-T2
- Electronic program guide
