= IBM 8514/A =

IBM graphics card and computer display standard

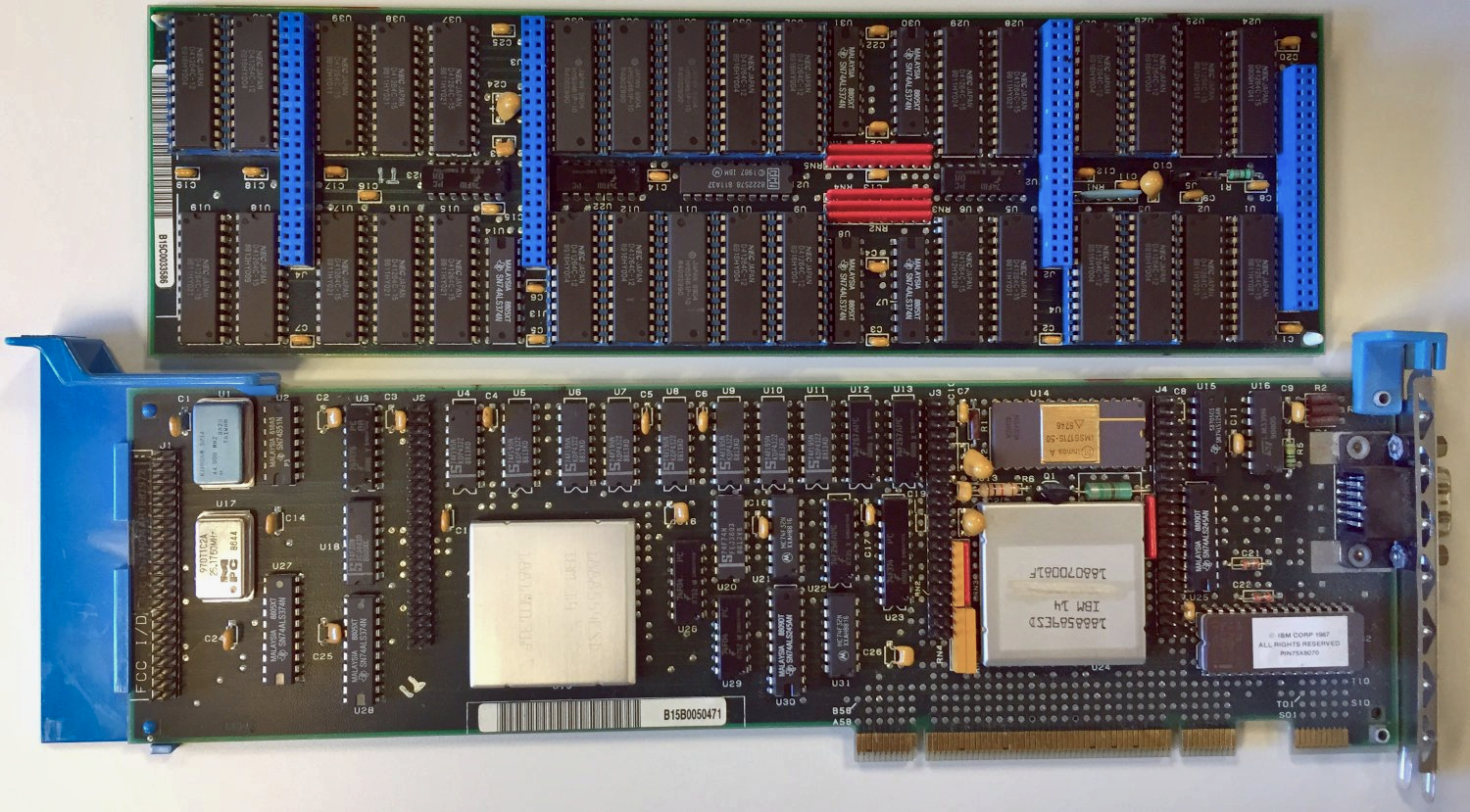
- Release date: 1987; 39 years ago

Cards
- Entry-level: IBM Image Adapter/A

History
- Predecessor: EGA, PGC
- Successor: XGA

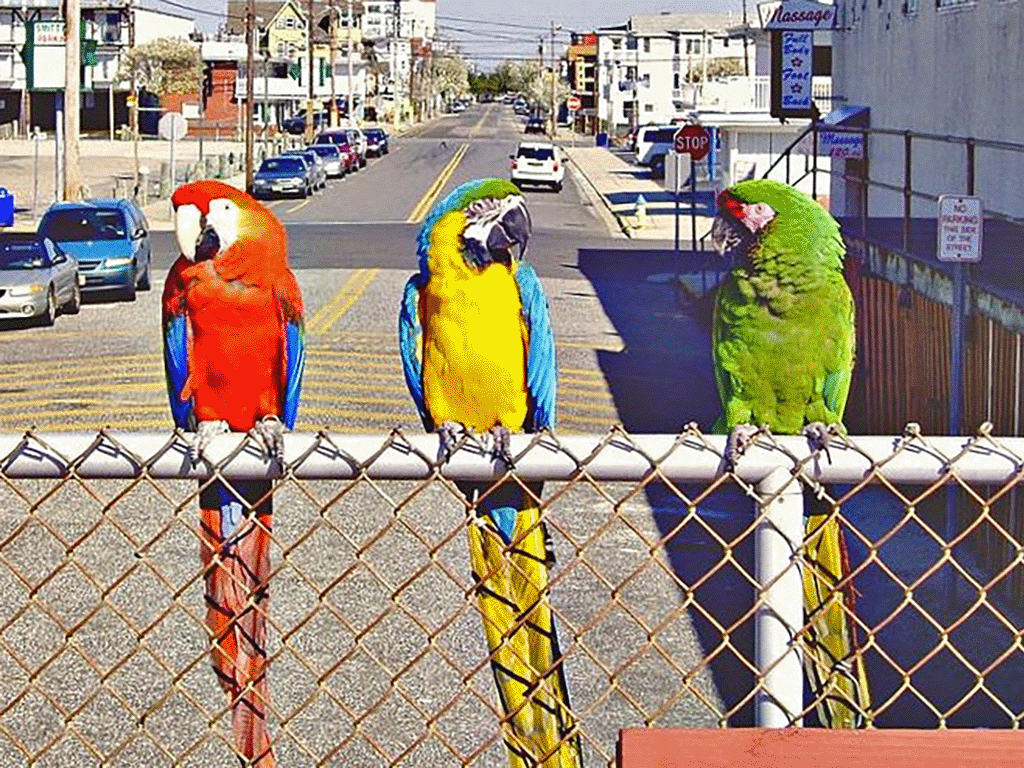
IBM 8514/A 1024 × 768 x 256 color image

The IBM 8514/A is a graphics card manufactured by IBM and introduced with the IBM PS/2 line of personal computers in 1987. It supports a display resolution of 1024 × 768 pixels with 256 colors at 43.5 Hz (interlaced), or 640 × 480 at 60 Hz (non-interlaced). IBM sold the companion CRT monitor (for use with the 8514/A) which carries the designation, 8514.

The 8514/A uses a standardised API called the "Adapter Interface" or AI. This interface is also used by XGA, IBM Image Adapter/A, and clones of the 8514/A and XGA such as the ATI Technologies Mach series and IIT AGX. The interface allows computer software to offload common 2D-drawing operations (line-draw, color-fill, and block copies via a blitter) onto the 8514/A hardware. This frees the host CPU for other tasks, and greatly improves the speed of redrawing a graphics visual (such as a pie-chart or CAD-illustration).

The 8514/A initially sold for $1290 for the adapter and $270 for the 512 KB memory expansion (equivalent to $3700 and $770, respectively, in 2025). The 8514/A required a Micro Channel architecture bus at a time when ISA systems were standard.

== History ==
The 8514/A was introduced with the IBM PS/2 computers in April 1987. It was an optional upgrade to the Micro Channel architecture based PS/2's Video Graphics Array (VGA), and was delivered within three months of PS/2's introduction.

Although not the first PC video card to support hardware acceleration, IBM's 8514/A is often credited as the first PC mass-market fixed-function graphics processing unit (GPU). Up until the 8514/A's introduction, PC graphics acceleration was relegated to expensive workstation-class, graphics coprocessor boards. Coprocessor boards (such as the TARGA Truevision series) were designed around special CPU or digital signal processor chips which were programmable. Fixed-function accelerators, such as the 8514/A, sacrificed programmability for better cost/performance ratio.

The ATI Mach 8 and Mach 32 chips were popular clones, and several companies (notably S3) designed graphics accelerator chips which were not register compatible but were conceptually very similar to the 8514/A.

The 8514/A was superseded by IBM XGA.

The VESA Group introduced a common standardized way to access features like hardware cursors, Bit Block transfers (Bit Blit), off screen sprites, hardware panning, drawing and other functions with VBE/accelerator functions (VBE/AF) in August 1996.

== Software support ==
Software that supported this graphic standard:

- OS/2
- Windows 2.1
- Windows 3.x
- Windows 95
- SCO Open Desktop
- XFree86 2.1.1
- AutoCAD 10
- QuikMenu
- Any BGI software using IBM8514.BGI

== Output capabilities ==
The 8514/A offered:

- 640 × 480 graphics with 256 colors out of 262,144 (18 bit RGB); text mode with 80×34 characters;
- 1024 × 768 graphics with 256 colors out of 262,144 (18 bit RGB); text mode with 85×38 or 146×51 characters;

Latter clone boards offered additional resolutions:

- 800 × 600 with 16-bit and 24-bit color depths
- 1280 × 1024 with 16-bit and 24-bit color depths

== Clones ==
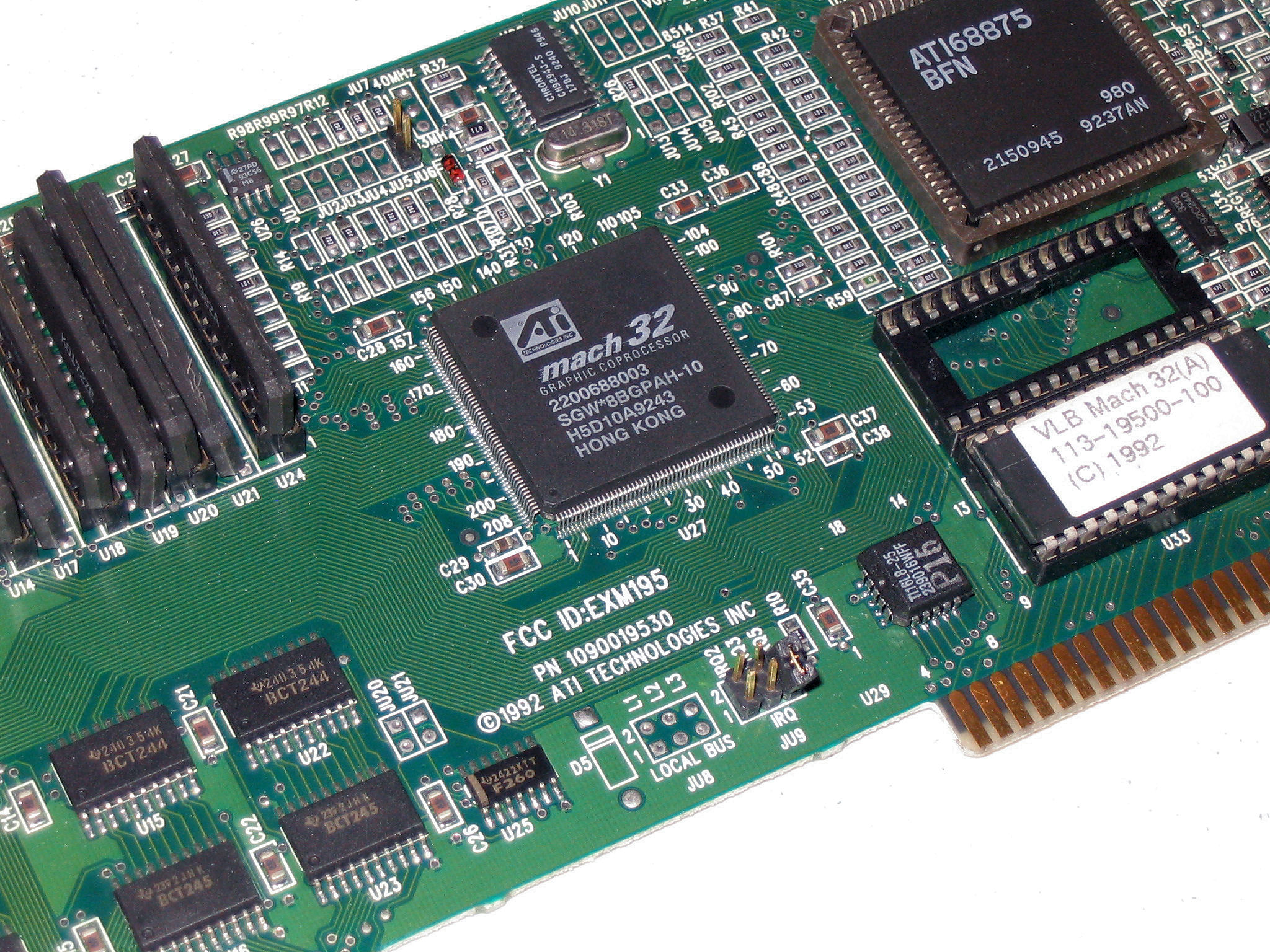
ATI Mach32 VLB video card

In the late 1980s, several companies cloned the 8514/A often for the ISA bus. Notable among those was Western Digital Imaging's PWGA-1 (also known as the WD9500 chip set), the Chips & Technologies 82C480, and ATI's Mach8 and later Mach32 chips. In one way or another, the clones were all better than the original with more speed, enhanced drawing functionality and overall improved video mode selections. Clone support for non-interlaced modes at resolutions like 800×600 and 1280×1024 was typical, and all clones had longer command queues for increased performance.

- ATI Technologies: the Mach8, Mach32, Graphics Vantage and 8514/Ultra
- Chips and Technologies: F82C480 B EIZO - AA40 and F82C481 Miro Magic Plus

== See also ==
- List of IBM products
- List of defunct graphics chips and card companies
