= David Orton =

David Orton may refer to:

- David E. Orton, American businessman
- David Orton (deep ecology) (1934–2011), Canadian writer and environmental activist
