= ATI Mach =

Series of video cards

ATI Mach series
- Release date: 1990; 36 years ago
- Codename: Mach
- Architecture: Mach

Cards
- Entry-level: Mach 8
- Mid-range: Mach 32
- High-end: Mach 64

History
- Predecessor: Wonder series
- Successor: Rage series

Support status
- Unsupported

The ATI Mach line was a series of 2D graphics accelerators for personal computers developed by ATI Technologies. It became an extension (and eventual successor) to the ATI Wonder series of cards. The first chip in the series was the ATI Mach8. It was essentially a clone of the IBM 8514/A with a few notable extensions such as Crystal fonts. Being one of the first graphics accelerator chips on the market, the Mach8 did not have an integrated VGA core. In order to use the first Mach8 coprocessor cards, a separate VGA card was required. This increased the cost of ownership as one had to purchase two rather than one expansion card for graphics. A temporary solution was presented with the ATI Graphics Ultra/Vantage cards, which combined an ATI 8514 Ultra and VGA Wonder+ into a single card (though using discrete ICs). The Mach32 chip was the follow-up to the Mach8, which finally featured an integrated VGA core, true colour support and a 64-bit datapath to internal memory.

== Models ==
=== Mach 8 ===
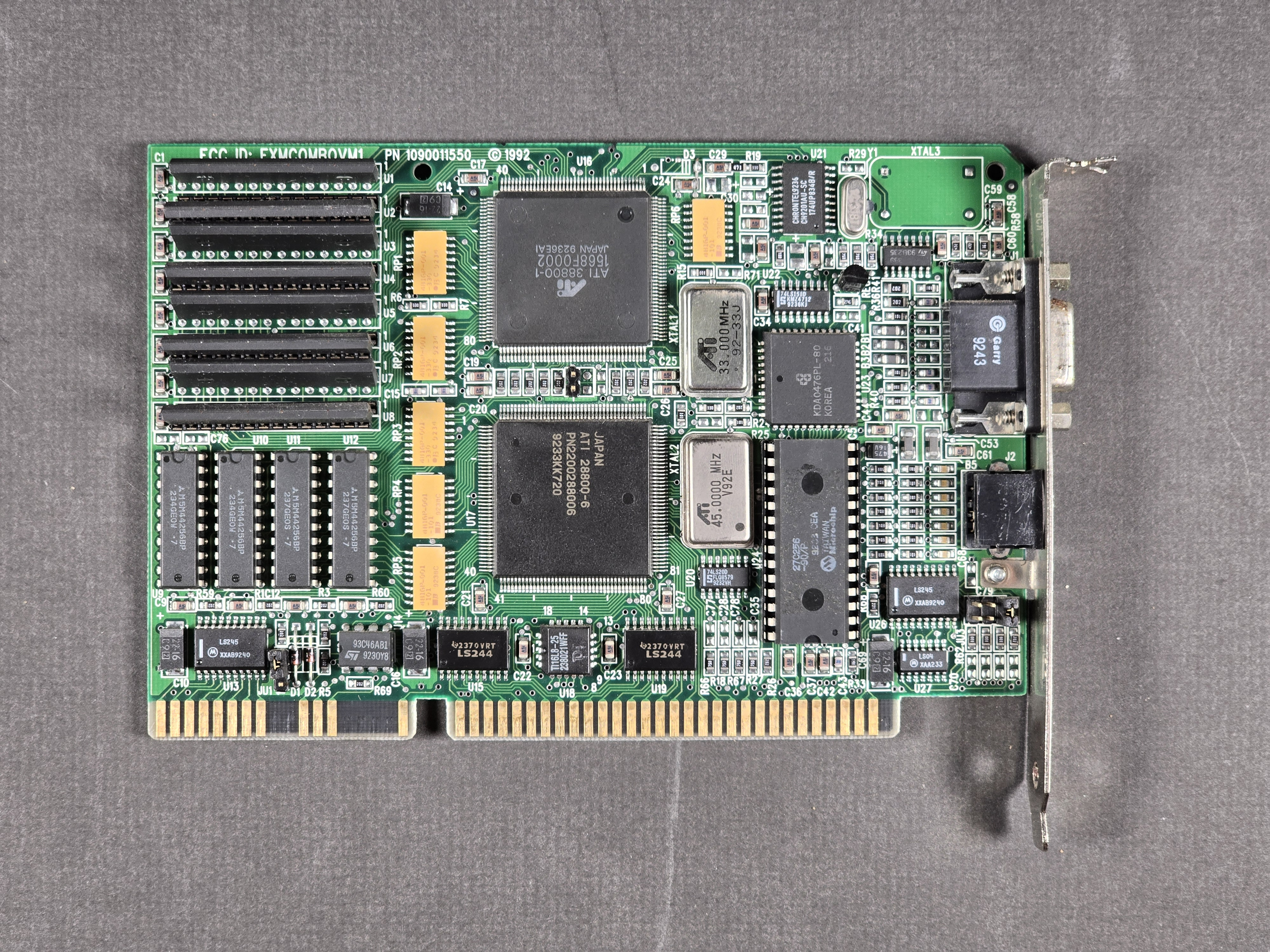
ATI Graphics Ultra ISA (Mach8 + VGA)

Released: 1990

- IBM 8514/A clone
- Support for up to 8-bit color modes
- Optional VGAWonder 2 (28800) graphics core (with dedicated 256–512 KiB DRAM)
- 512 KiB or 1 MiB available with either DRAM or VRAM
- Port: ISA, MCA

The Mach 8 chip was used on the following ATI products:

- 8514 Ultra (VRAM, coprocessor only)
- 8514 Vantage (DRAM, coprocessor only)
- Graphics Vantage (DRAM)
- Graphics Ultra (VRAM)
- VGAWonder GT (Repackaged Graphics Ultra, 1 MiB RAM standard)

=== Mach 32 ===
Released: 1992

- 32-bit GUI accelerator with basic DOS support
- Limited VESA VBE support
- Support for 15 bpp (bits per pixel), 16 bpp and 24 bpp color modes added
- Video memory: 1 or 2 MiB DRAM or VRAM
- Memory interface: 64-bit
- Port: ISA, EISA, VLB, PCI, MCA
- Integrated VGA core
- 100% compatible with IBM 8514/A

The Mach 32 chip was used on the following ATI products:

- Graphics Wonder (DRAM)
- Graphics Ultra + (DRAM, fast RAMDAC)
- Graphics Ultra CLX (DRAM, cost-reduced OEM version)
- Graphics Ultra Pro (VRAM)
- Graphics Ultra XLR (VRAM, cost-reduced OEM version)

=== Mach 64 ===
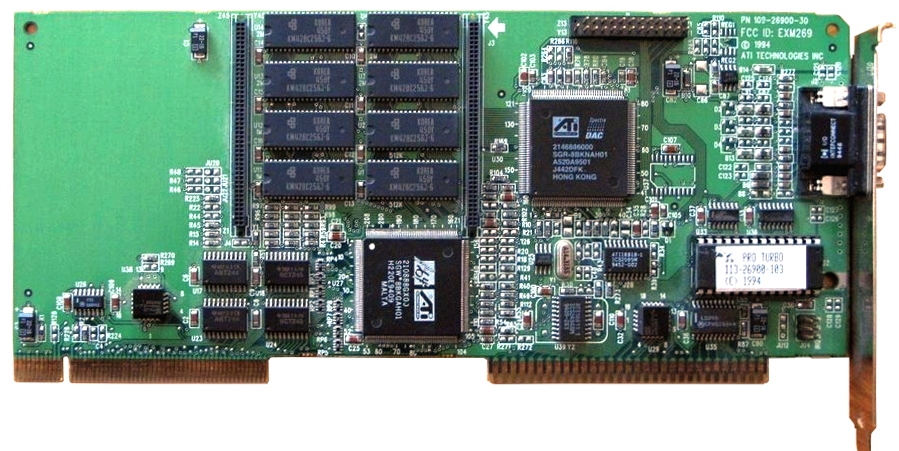
Graphics Pro Turbo VLB (Mach64GX)

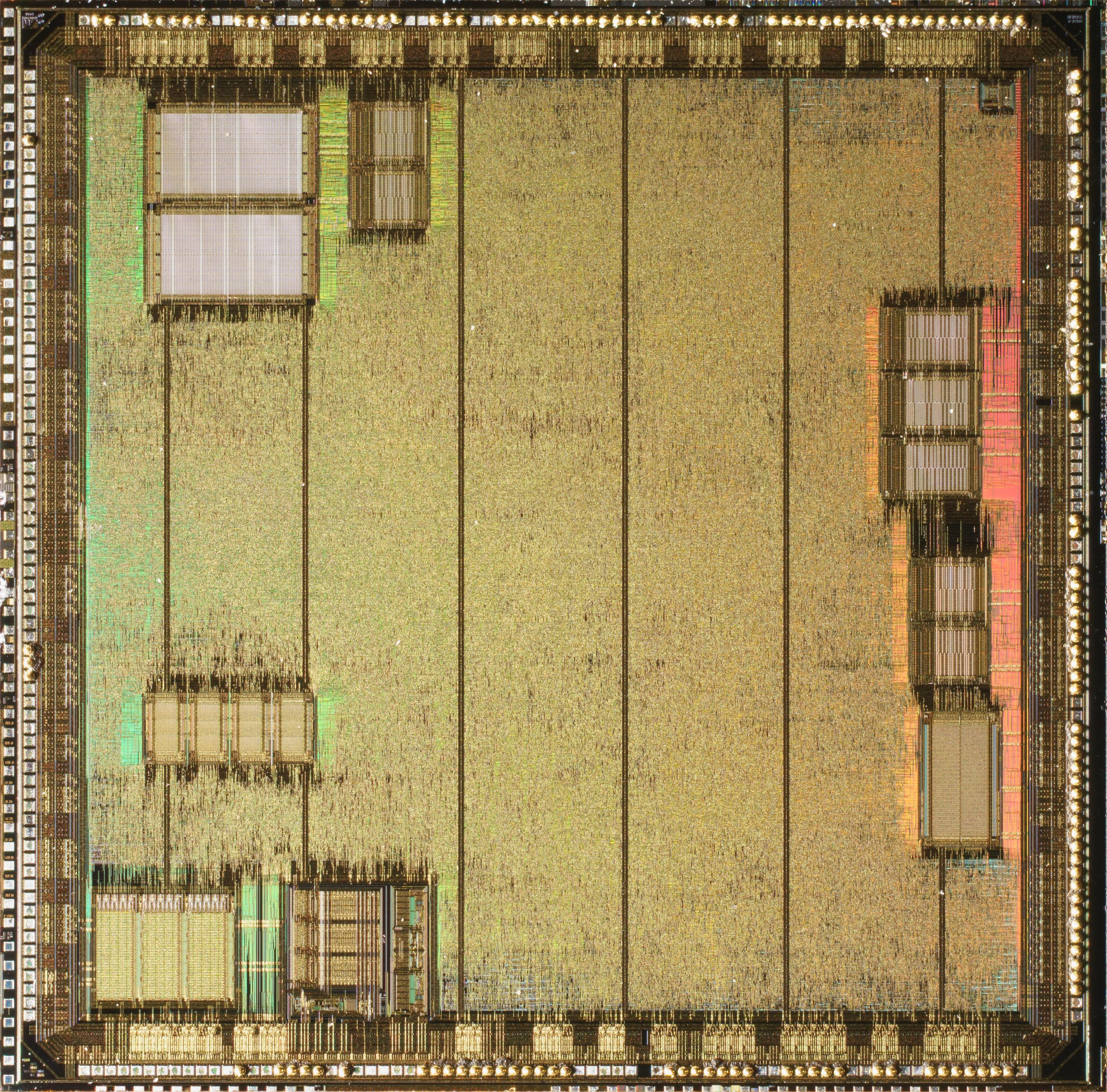
Die shot of the Mach64 GT-B

Released: 1994

- 64-bit GUI accelerator with basic DOS support
- Limited VESA VBE support
- Video memory: 1, 2, 4 or 8 MiB DRAM, VRAM, or SGRAM
- Memory interface: 64-bit
- Port: ISA, VLB, PCI
- Variants:
  - "Mach64 CX/210888" - Original chipset, uncommon (up to 2 MiB DRAM, or 4 MiB VRAM)
  - "Mach64 GX/210888GX" - Enhanced video playback capabilities
  - "Mach64 ET/210888ET" - Embedded???
  - "Mach64 CT/264CT - Cost-reduced Mach64 with integrated RAMDAC and clock chip (up to 2 MiB DRAM)
  - "Mach64 VT/264VT - AMC connector (Support for TV-tuner)
  - "Mach64 VT/264VT2
  - "Mach64 VT/264VT4 - Last ATi 2D card, has some basic 3D capabilities not intended to be used
  - "Mach64 GT/264GT 3D Rage" - 3D capabilities
  - "Mach64 GT-B/264GT-B 3D Rage II - SDRAM & SGRAM support(up to 8 MiB)
  - "Mach64 LT/264LT" - Low-power mobile version of Mach64 GT

The Mach 64 chip was used on the following ATI products:

Mach64 GX Family:

- Graphics Xpression (1 or 2 MiB DRAM)
- Graphics Pro Turbo (2 or 4 MiB VRAM)
- WinTurbo (1 or 2 MiB VRAM, non-upgradable)
- Graphics Pro Turbo 1600 (fast RAMDAC, PCI-only)
- XCLAIM GA (Macintosh)

Mach64 CT Family:

- WinBoost (1 MiB DRAM, upgradable to 2 MiB)
- WinCharger (2 MiB DRAM)

Mach64 VT Family:

- Video Charger
- Video Xpression (Mach64VT / Mach64 VT2)
- Video Xpression+ (Mach64 VT4)

Mach64 GT Family:

- 3D Xpression (2 MiB EDO DRAM))

Mach64 GT-B Family:

- 3D Charger (2 MiB EDO DRAM)
- 3D XPRESSION+ (2 or 4 MiB SDRAM)
- 3D XPRESSION+ PC2TV (TV-out)
- 3D Pro Turbo (2, 4, 6 or 8 MiB SGRAM)
- 3D Pro Turbo+ PC2TV (TV-out)
- Xclaim VR - early versions (Macintosh, 2, 4 or 8 MiB SGRAM, Video-In Video-Out)
- Xclaim 3D - early versions (Macintosh, 4 or 8 MiB SGRAM)
- All-In-Wonder (SDRAM, TV Tuner)

The 3D Rage and 3D Rage II chips were also known as Mach64 GT and Mach64 GT-B respectively. The Mach64 moniker was eliminated with introduction of the 3D Rage Pro.

== See also ==
- List of AMD graphics processing units
