= All-in-Wonder =

Family of combination graphics/TV tuner cards from ATI Technologies

All-in-Wonder family
- Release date: 1996–2006, 2008

The All-in-Wonder (also abbreviated to AIW) was a combination graphics card/TV tuner card designed by ATI Technologies. It was introduced on November 11, 1996. ATI had previously used the Wonder trademark on other graphics cards (ATI Wonder series), however, they were not full TV/graphics combo cards (EGA Wonder, VGA Wonder, Graphics Wonder). ATI also made other TV oriented cards that use the word Wonder (TV Wonder, HDTV Wonder, DV Wonder), and remote control (Remote Wonder). The All-in-Wonder line debuted with the Rage chipset series. The cards were available in two forms, built by third-party manufacturers (marked as "Powered by ATI") as well as by ATI itself ("Built by ATI").

Each of the All-in-Wonder Radeon cards is based on a Radeon chipset with extra features incorporated onto the board. AIW cards run at lower clock speeds (two exceptions are the AIW 9600XT/AIW X800XT faster/same speed) than their conventional counterparts to reduce heat and power consumption. In June 2008, AMD revived the product line with an HD model.

== Accessories ==
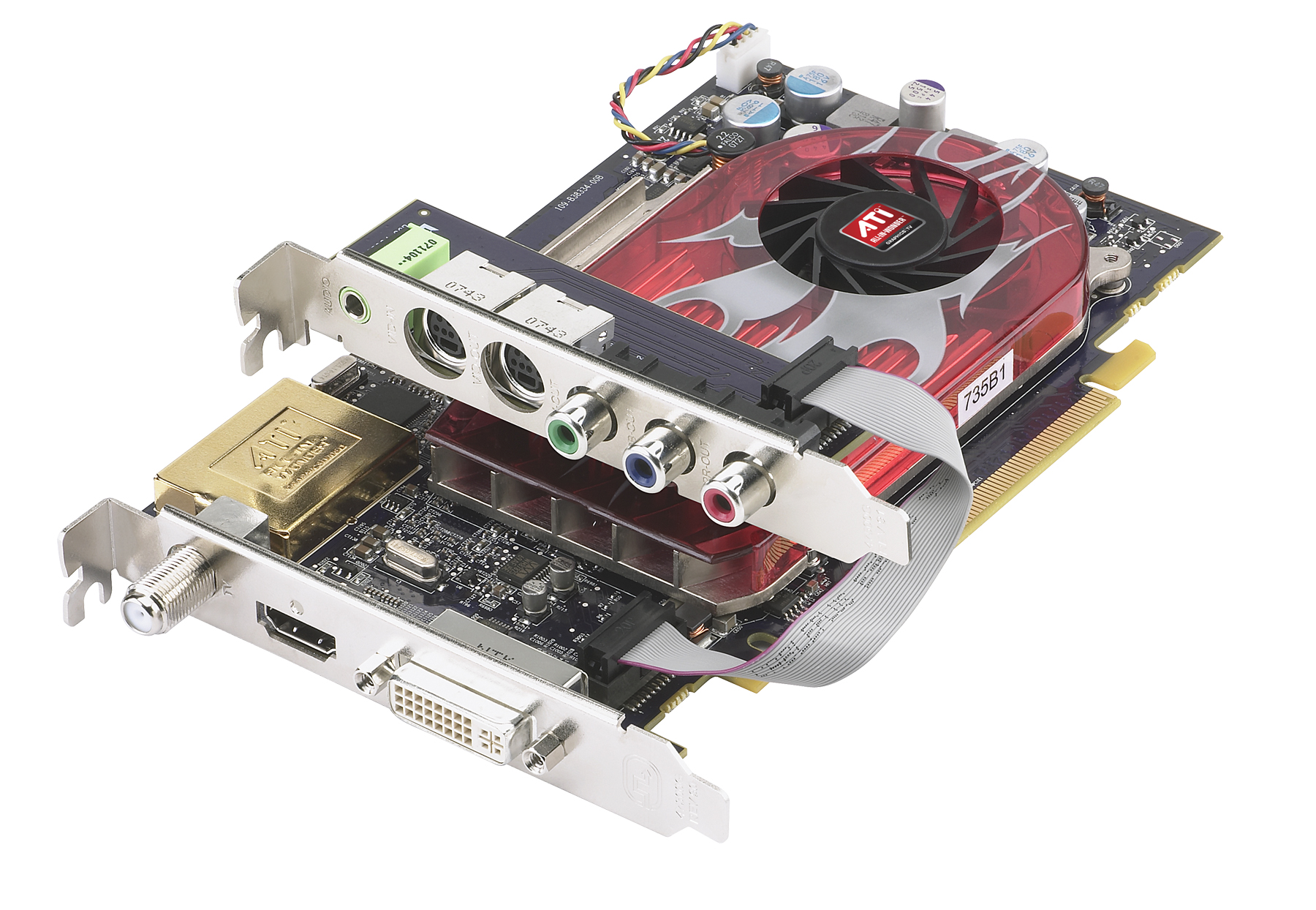
All-in-Wonder HD Graphics and TV Tuner Card with Accessory Kit

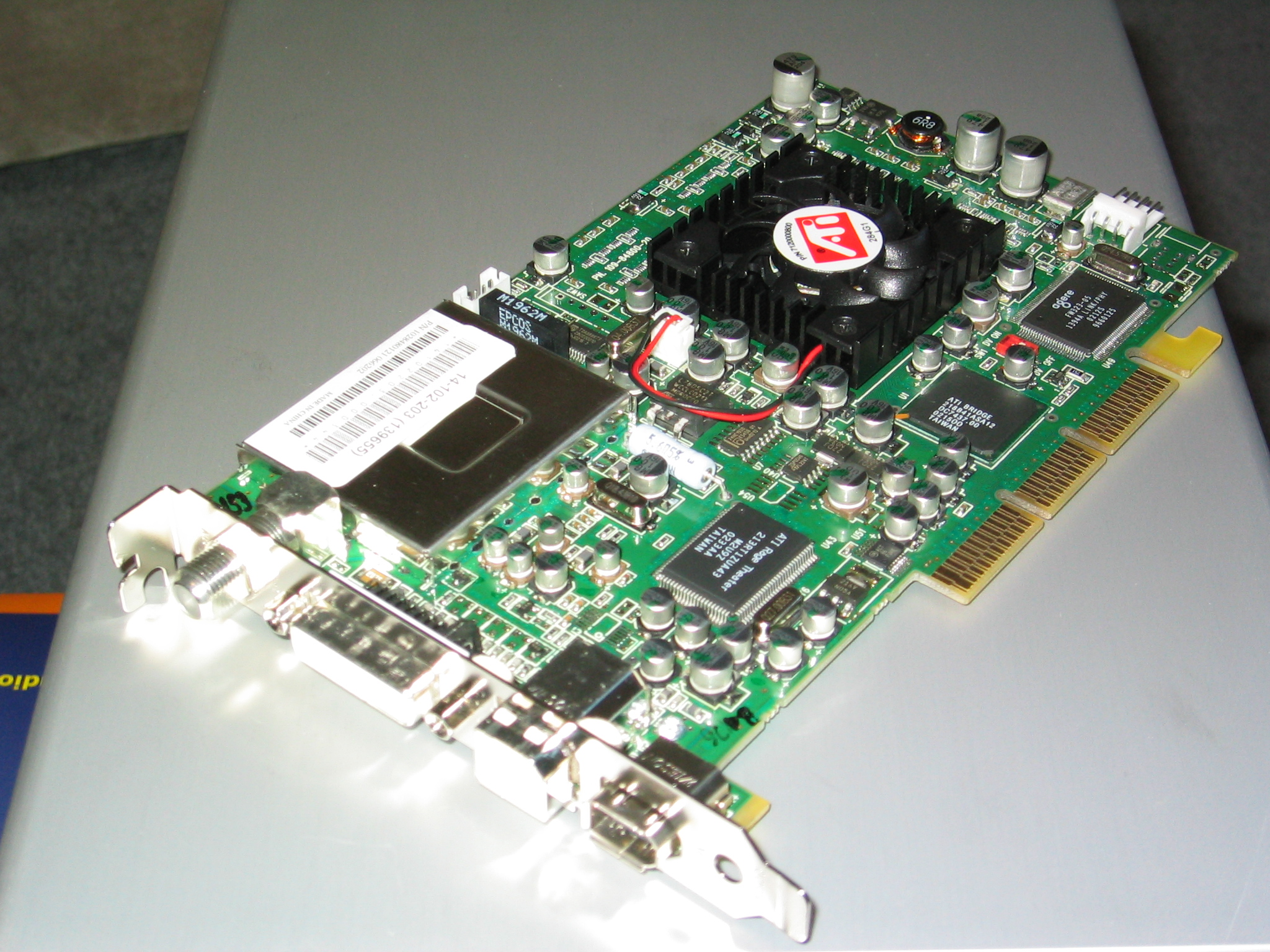
All-in-Wonder Radeon 8500 DV

The cards use a variety of specialised ports along the side to provide output to televisions, with the retail version equipped with composite ports and the ability to output to component. Later products also comes with a Remote Wonder remote control and a USB RF receiver to receive radio frequency signals from the remote. Some variants of the All-in-Wonder included FM radio tuning as well. Some analog tuners were bundled with Gemstar's Guide Plus+ electronic program guide for TV listings, while digital tuners used TitanTV instead.

== Drivers ==
The AIW card drivers are based on ATI's Catalyst drivers with additional T200 unified stream drivers. Currently, the only operating systems fully supporting TV capture with these cards are Microsoft Windows XP, 2000, 98, and 95. Display drivers work on Linux, and TV capture is supported on some cards with the GATOS project.

== Lineup ==
Retail name	Chipset based on	Variants	Digital/analog signal	AVIVO	Available interface	Introduction date
All-in-Wonder HD	Radeon HD 3650	(Generic only)	Digital/analog	Yes	PCI Express 2.0	June 26, 2008
All-in-Wonder X1900	Radeon X1900	(Generic only)	Digital/analog	Yes	PCI Express	January 24, 2006
All-in-Wonder X1800 XL	Radeon X1800 XL		Digital/analog	Yes	PCI Express	November 21, 2005
All-in-Wonder 2006 PCI Express	Radeon X1300	(Generic only)	Digital/analog	Yes	PCI Express	December 22, 2005
All-in-Wonder X800	Radeon X800	GT, XL, XT	Analog(/digital on GT)	No	PCI Express, AGP	September 9, 2004 (XT)
All-in-Wonder X600 Pro	Radeon X600 Pro		Analog	No	PCI Express	September 21, 2004
All-in-Wonder 9800	Radeon 9800	SE, Pro	Analog	No	AGP	April 7, 2003
All-in-Wonder 9700	Radeon 9700 Pro	Regular, Pro	Analog	No	AGP	September 30, 2002; February 25, 2003 (Europe, Pro variant)
All-in-Wonder 9600	Radeon 9600	XT, Pro, Regular	Analog	No	AGP	August 5, 2003 (Pro); January 6, 2004 (Regular, XT)
All-in-Wonder 9200	Radeon 9200		Analog	No	AGP, PCI	January 26, 2004
All-in-Wonder 9000 Pro	Radeon 9000 Pro		Analog	No	AGP	March 31, 2003
All-in-Wonder Radeon 8500	Radeon 8500	Regular, 128MB, DV	Analog	No	AGP	August 30, 2001 (DV)
All-in-Wonder Radeon 7500	Radeon 7500		Analog	No	AGP	January 22, 2002
All-in-Wonder VE	Radeon 7000		Analog	No	PCI	December 2, 2002; February 25, 2003 (Europe)
All-in-Wonder Radeon	Radeon 7200		Analog	No	AGP, PCI	July 31, 2000
All-in-Wonder 128	3D Rage 128	Regular, Pro	Analog	No	AGP, PCI	January 25, 1999
All-in-Wonder Pro	3D Rage Pro		Analog	No	AGP, PCI	October 20, 1997
All-in-Wonder	3D Rage II+	2MB, 4MB	Analog	No	PCI	November 11, 1996

== See also ==
- ATI Wonder series
- Comparison of ATI Graphics Processing Units
- List of AMD graphics processing units
