= ArtX =

Defunct graphics chip company

- Industry: Semiconductors
- Founded: September 1997
- Founders: Wei Yen; David Orton
- Defunct: February 2000
- Fate: Acquired by ATI Technologies
- Headquarters: Palo Alto, California, United States
- Number of employees: 20

ArtX was a semiconductor design company founded in 1997 by a group of 20 former Silicon Graphics employees, led by executives Wei Yen and David Orton. The company initially sought to develop a high-performance, cost-effective graphics chip for the IBM PC compatible market, competing with established firms such as 3dfx and emerging competitors like Nvidia. ArtX became better known for designing the Flipper graphics chip used in Nintendo's GameCube console. The company was acquired by ATI Technologies in 2000, and its work formed the basis for ATI's Radeon line of GPUs, which continued under AMD following its acquisition of ATI in 2006.

== History ==
In late 1997, Silicon Graphics filed a non-compete lawsuit against ArtX, alleging that the company's staff would make use of proprietary trade secrets. The lawsuit was quietly dropped in 1998.

In May 1998, ArtX was contracted by Nintendo to develop the system logic and graphics processor, named Flipper, for its next-generation game console, then known by the codename "Dolphin", and later renamed the GameCube ahead of its release in 2001. At the time, Nintendo of America chairman Howard Lincoln described ArtX as being led by "Dr. Wei Yen, the man who was primarily responsible for the N64 graphics chip", and praised the team as "one of the best teams of 3D graphics engineers on the planet."

ArtX publicly demonstrated its first integrated graphics chipset, which included a built-in geometry engine, at COMDEX in the fall of 1999. The chipset was incorporated into the Aladdin 7 northbridge sold by Taiwan-based ALi.

In February 2000, ArtX was acquired by ATI Technologies for $400 million in stock. An ATI spokesperson stated, "ATI now becomes a major supplier to the game console market via Nintendo. The [GameCube] platform is reputed to be king of the hill in terms of graphics and video performance with 128-bit architecture." ArtX's work would also lay the foundation for ATI's R300 graphics processor (released in 2002 as the Radeon 9700), which became the basis for its consumer and professional GPUs over the following years.
