= ATI Wonder =

Series of video cards

ATI Wonder series
- Release date: 1986; 40 years ago
- Codename: Wonder
- Architecture: Wonder

Cards
- Entry-level: Wonder MDA/CGA
- Mid-range: Wonder EGA
- High-end: Wonder VGA

History
- Successor: Mach series

Support status
- Unsupported

The ATI Wonder is a series of video cards for the IBM Personal Computer and compatibles, introduced by ATI Technologies in the mid to late 1980s. These cards were unique at the time as they offered the end user a considerable amount of value by combining support for multiple graphics standards (and monitors) into a single card. The VGA Wonder series added additional value with the inclusion of a bus mouse port, which normally required the installation of a dedicated Microsoft Mouse adapter.

The VGA Wonder series later merged with the ATI Mach series of cards in 1990. The ATI Graphics Ultra (VRAM) and ATI Graphics Vantage (DRAM) cards both featured independent VGA Wonder ASICs in addition to their Mach8 8514 compatible graphics processor. The Graphics Ultra was later renamed the VGA Wonder GT. In 1992, their following product line, the Mach32, integrated the VGA wonder core and coprocessor into a single IC. At this point the VGA Wonder line was cancelled and replaced with a cost reduced DRAM based version of Mach32 known as the ATI Graphics Wonder.

== MDA/CGA cards ==
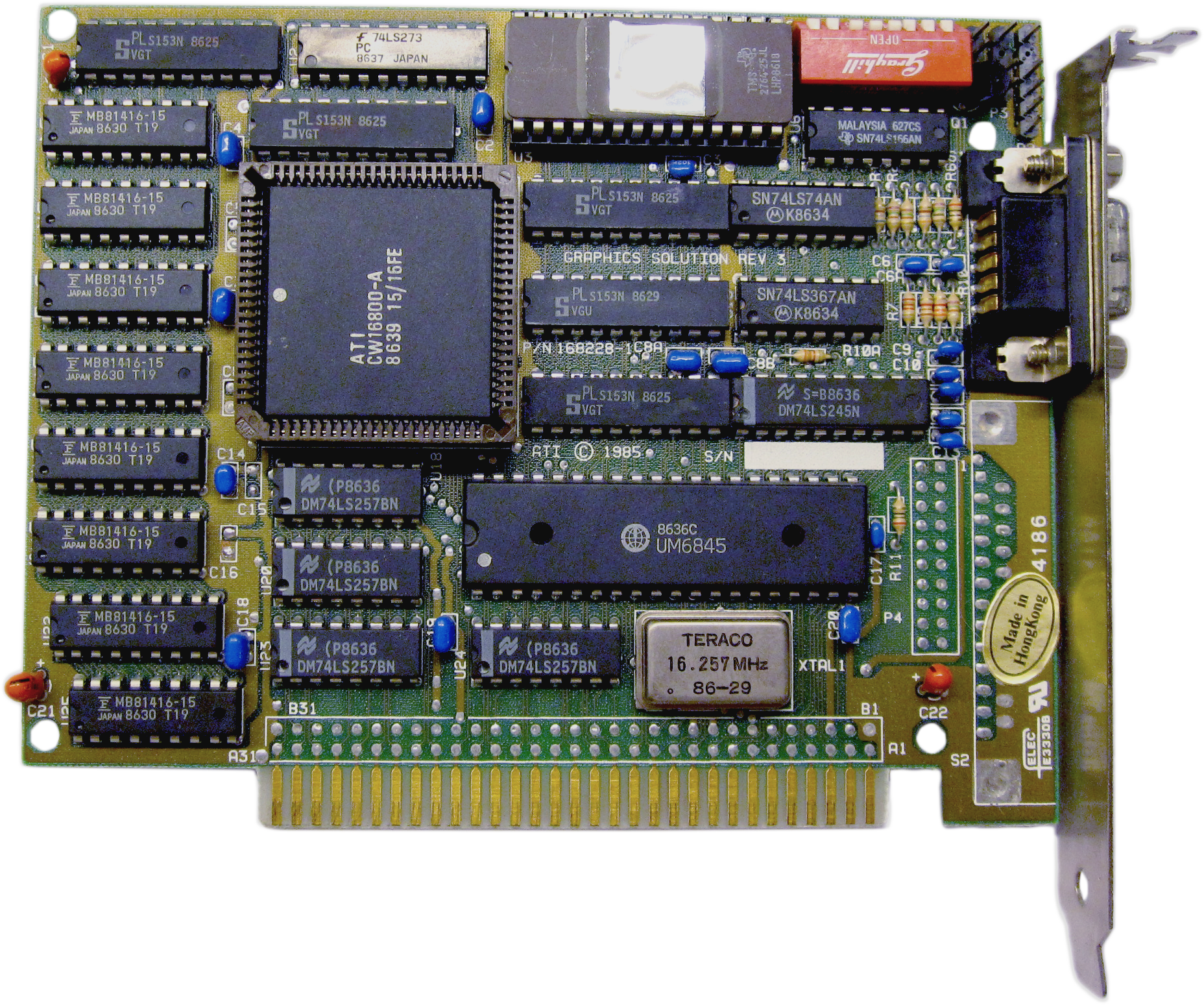
One of the early graphics cards from ATI Technologies: a Graphics Solution Rev 3 Hercules graphics card from 1986. As can be seen from the PCB the layout was done in 1985, whereas the marking on the central chip CW16800-A says "8639" meaning that chip was manufactured week 39, 1986.

=== ATI Graphics Solution Rev 3 (1986) ===
- Chipset: ATI CW16800-A
- Supports: Hercules Graphics Card mode and extended 132 × 25 / 132 × 44 text-modes on TTL monochrome monitors
- Supports: All CGA modes on both CGA/EGA and TTL monochrome monitors
- Switching between CGA and Hercules compatibility is done via supplied utility (VSET.EXE) and doesn't require a reboot
- Composite video output is available on an internal 3-pin connector (no support for colors, works only in the 40 × 25 text-mode or 320 × 200 graphics modes)
- Port: 8-bit PC/XT bus

=== ATI Color Emulation Card (1986) ===
- Did at least support CGA graphics output to a TTL monochrome monitor

=== ATI Graphics Solution Plus (1987) ===
- Chipset: ATI CW16800-B
- Supports CGA, Plantronics Colorplus CGA & Hercules Graphics Card graphics modes
- Compatible with MDA, CGA (and therefore also EGA displays), DIP switch selectable
- 64KB of DRAM
- Port: 8-bit PC/XT bus

=== Graphics Solution Plus SP ===
- Chipset: ATI CW16800-B
- Adds Serial/Parallel Ports

=== Graphics Solution SR ===
- Chipset: ATI CW16800-B
- Uses static RAM

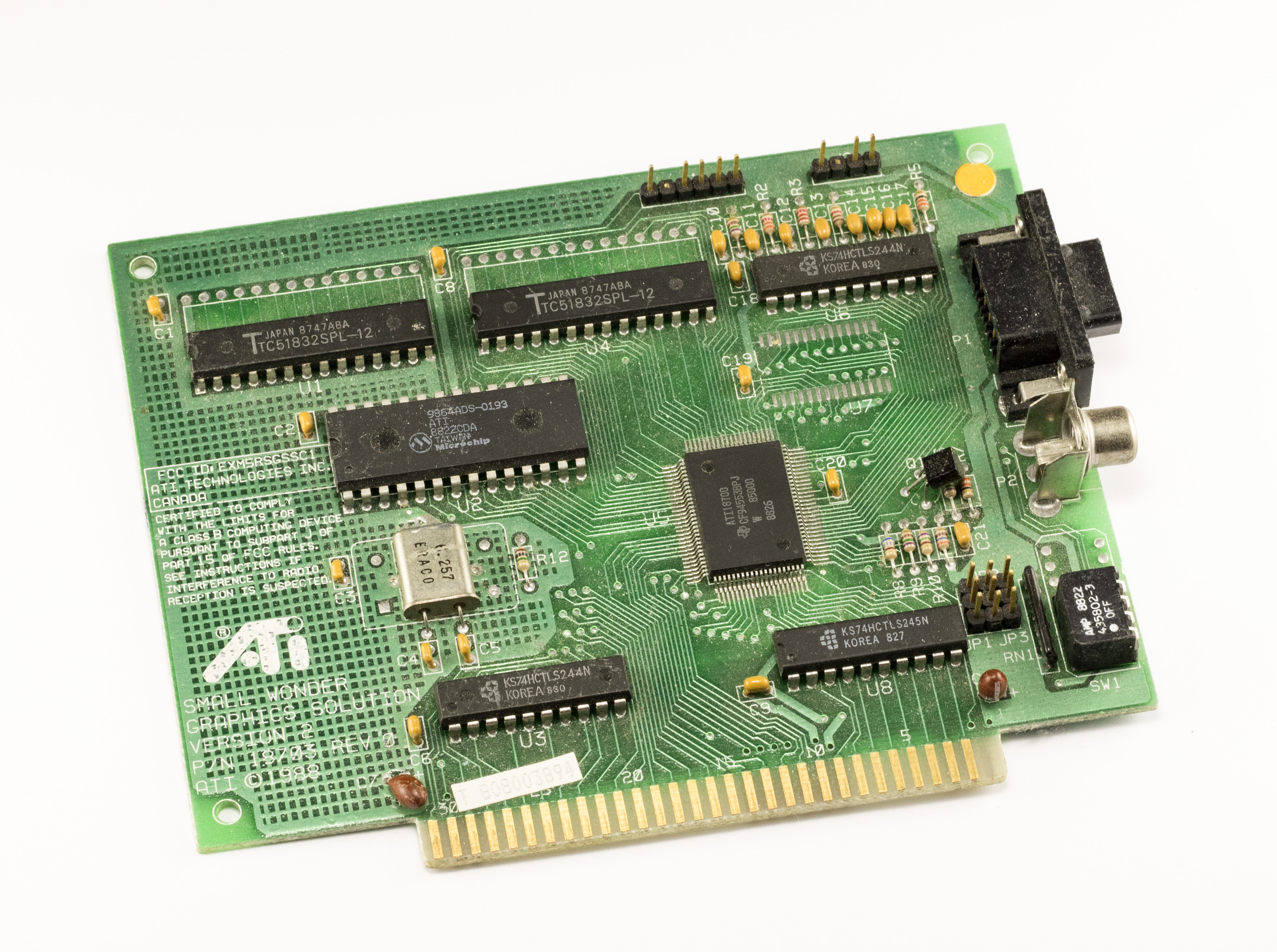
ATI Small Wonder Graphics Solution

=== ATI Small Wonder Graphics Solution (1988) ===
- Chipset: ATI 18700
- Also known as Graphics Solution Single Chip or just GS-SC
- Single-chip version of the Graphics Solution plus
- 64KB of static RAM
- Composite output

=== Graphics Solution Single Chip or GS-SC with Game (1988) ===
- Includes a game port
- Lacks external composite video connector

== EGA cards ==
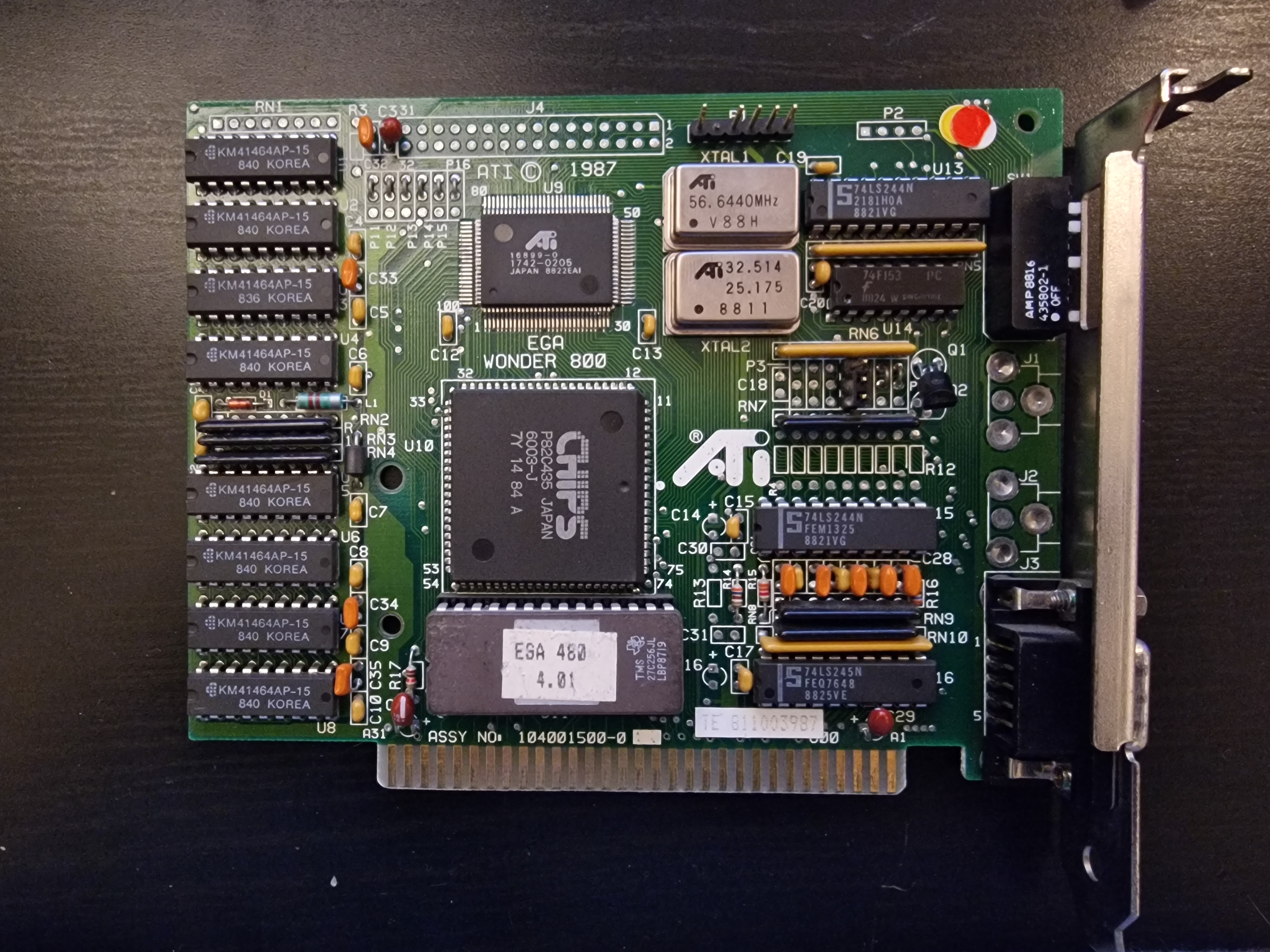
ATI EGA Wonder 480

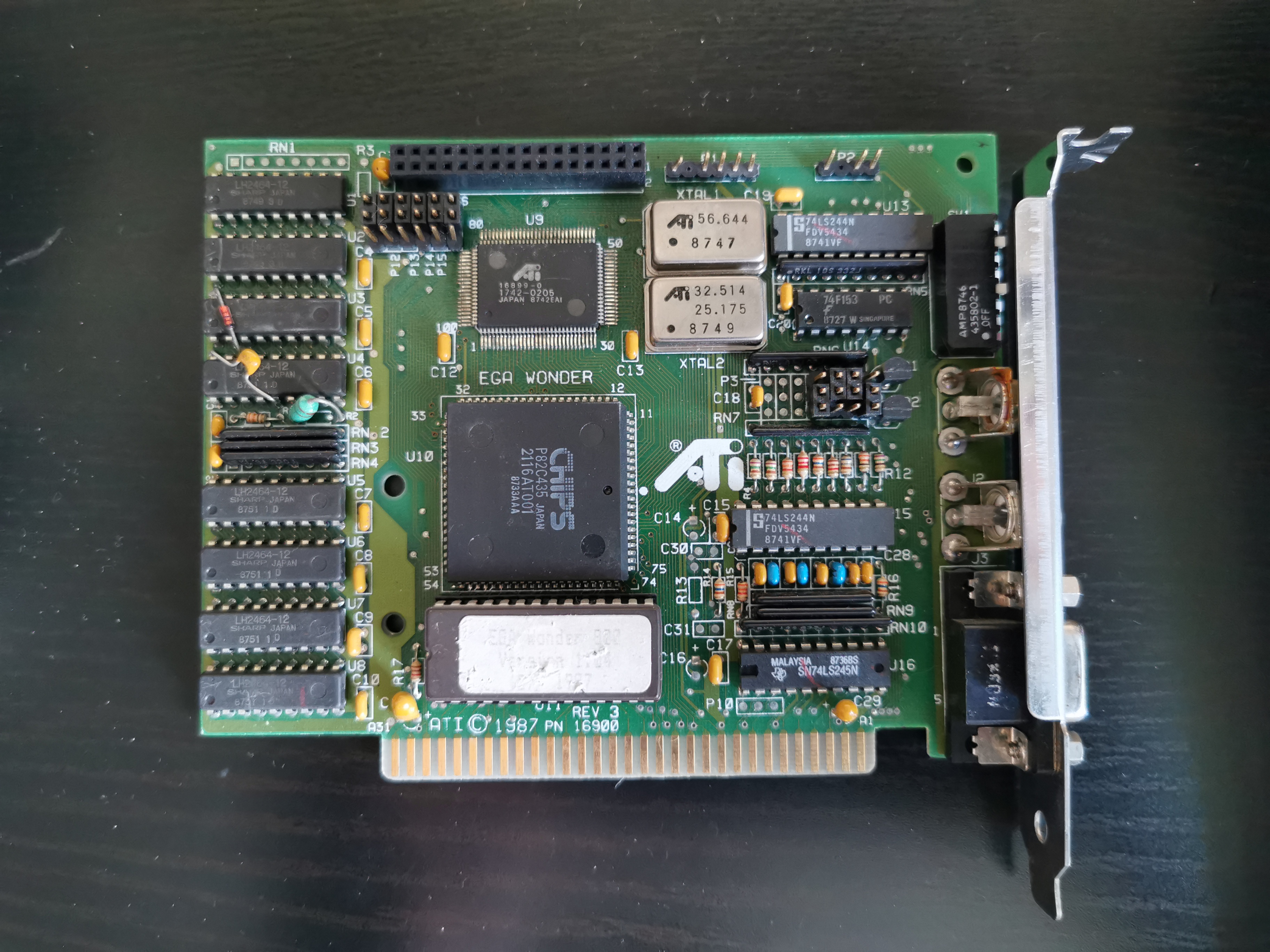
ATI EGA Wonder 800

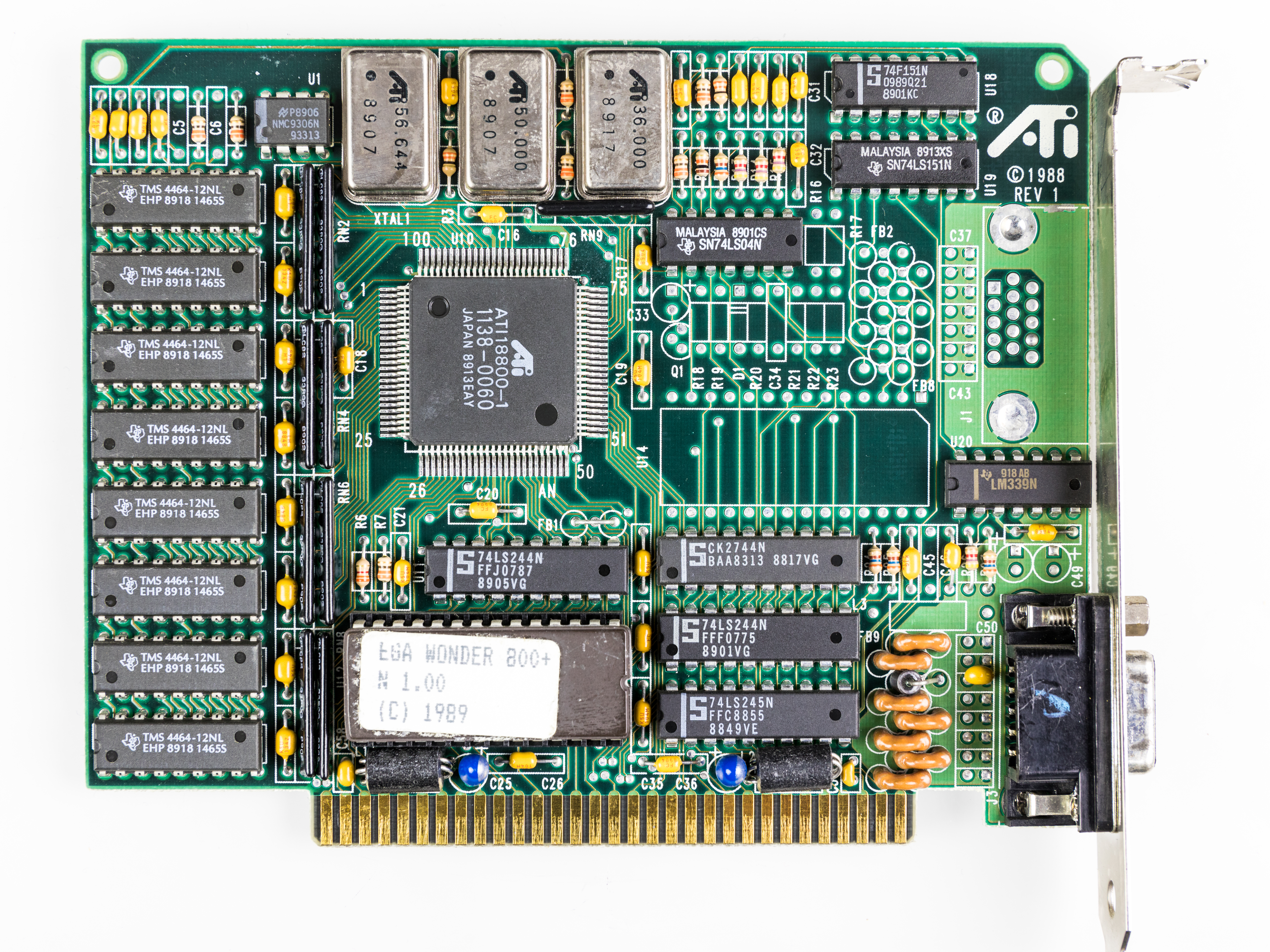
ATI EGA Wonder 800+

=== ATI EGA Wonder (1987) ===
- Chipset: ATI16899-0 + CHIPS P86C435
- Supports CGA, Hercules mono & EGA graphics modes
- Removes support for plantronics mode/Single-page Hercules mode/composite output
- Compatible with MDA, CGA and EGA displays (DIP switch selectable)
- Internal composite video port for machines such as IBM 5155 Portable
- 256KB DRAM
- Port: 8-bit PC/XT bus
- Original MSRP: $399

=== ATI EGA Wonder 480 (1988) ===
- Cost reduced EGA Wonder 800, lacking jumpers, RCA and feature connector. Different BIOS.

=== ATI EGA Wonder 800 (1987) ===
- Added support for extended EGA text and graphics modes (requires multisync monitor)
- Added support for 16-colour VGA modes

=== ATI EGA Wonder 800+ (1988) ===
- Rebadged VGA Edge lacking the analogue VGA port
- Chipset: ATI 18800
- Can auto-detect monitor type connected (DIP switches no longer present)

== VGA cards ==
=== ATI VIP or VGA Improved Performance (1987) ===
- Chipset: ATI 16899-0 & Chips P82C441
- Supports CGA, Hercules mono, EGA & VGA graphics with Softsense automatic mode switching
- Compatible with MDA, CGA, EGA and VGA displays (DIP switch selectable)
- 9-pin TTL and 15-pin analogue connectors
- 256KB DRAM
- Port: 8-bit PC/XT bus
- Original MSRP: $449 ($99 for Compaq expansion module)

=== ATI VGA Wonder (1988) ===
- Chipset: ATI 18800
- Adds support for SVGA graphics modes
- Adds support for monitor auto-sensing (switchless configuration)
- Uses on-board EEPROM to store configuration information
- 256KB or 512KB DRAM
- Port: 8-bit PC/XT bus

=== ATI VGA Edge 8 ===
- Cost Reduced VGA Wonder
- 256KB DRAM

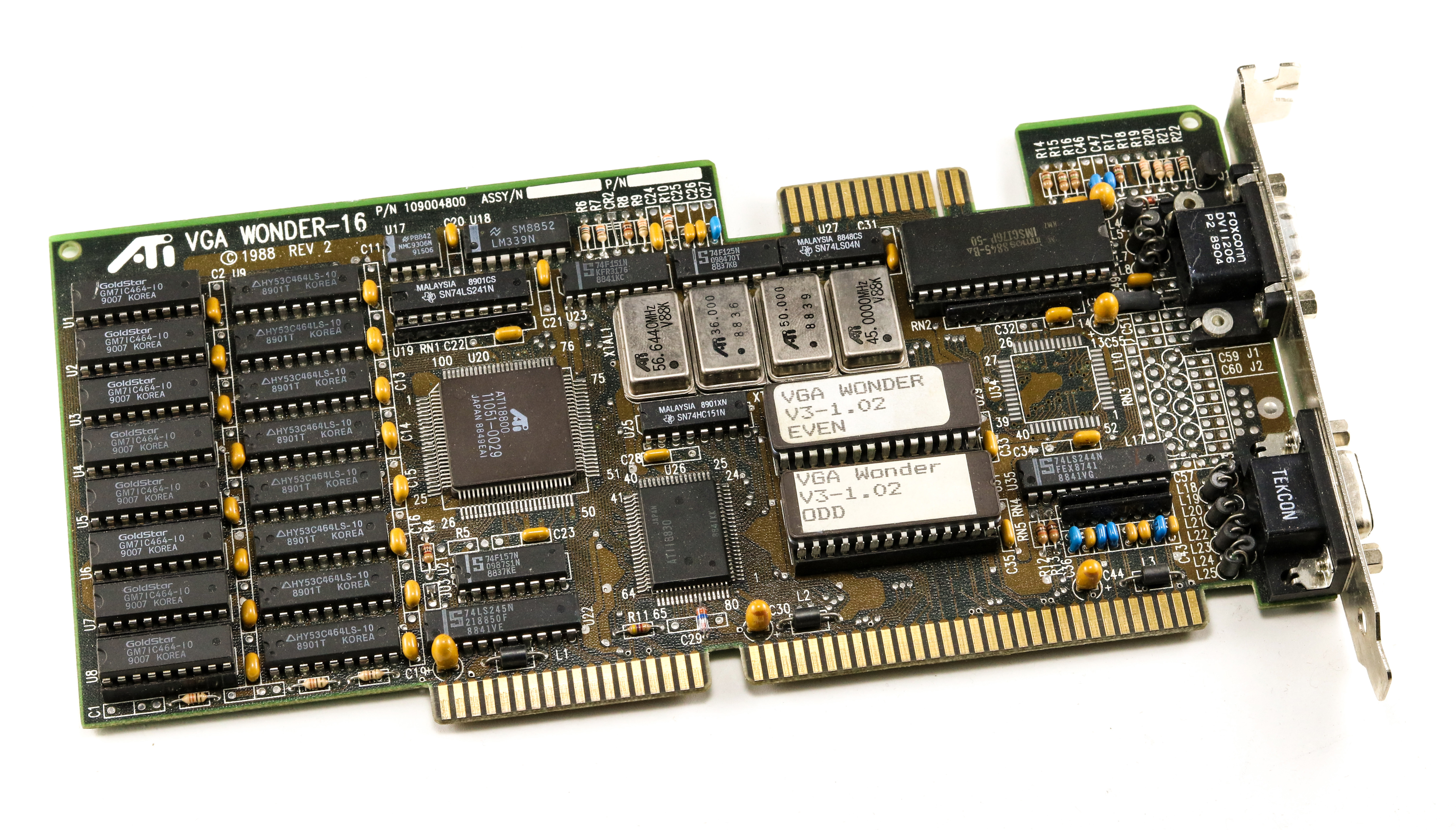
ATI VGA Wonder-16

=== ATI VGA Wonder-16 (1988) ===
- Speed enhancements due to a wider bus
- VGA pass through connector
- Bus mouse connector
- 256KB or 512KB DRAM
- Port: 16-bit PC/AT bus (ISA), 8-bit compatible
- Original MSRP: $499 or $699 respectively

=== ATI VGA Edge-16 ===
- Cost reduced VGA Wonder 16
- Lacks the bus mouse connector and the digital TTL output
- 256KB DRAM (not expandable to 512KB)

=== ATI VGA Wonder+ (1990) ===
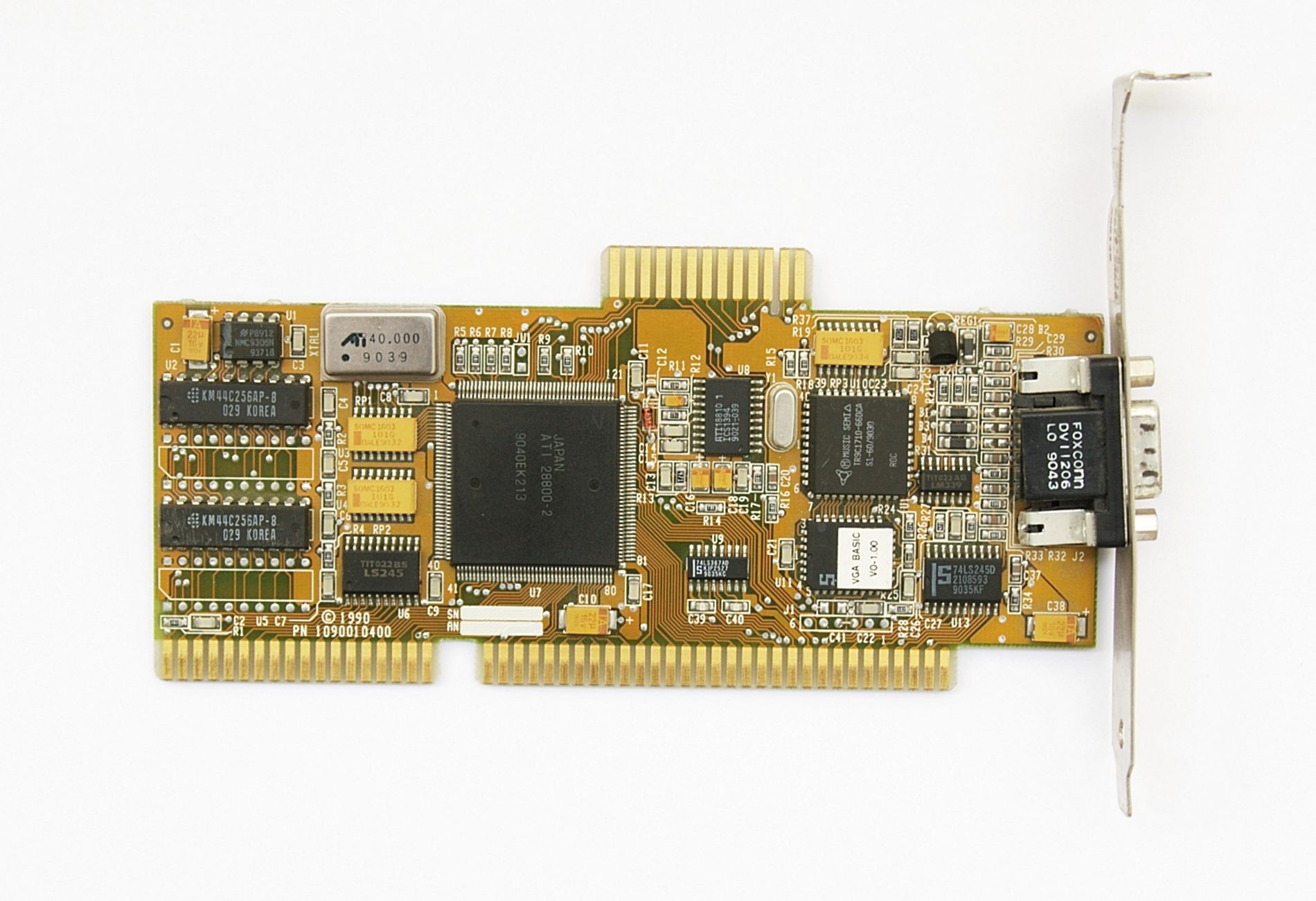
ATI VGA Wonder+

- Chipset: ATI 28800–2, -4, or -5
- Based on a new chipset which claimed to offer speeds rivalling VRAM based cards
- Dual page mode memory access
- Dynamic CPU/CRT interleaving
- 256KB or 512KB DRAM

=== ATI VGA Integra (1990) ===
- Cost reduced version based on new ATI 28800 ASIC
- Lacks bus mouse connector
- Uses a much smaller PCB with a surface mount BIOS & RAMDAC
- Supports SVGA Graphics with 72 Hz refresh rates
- 512KB DRAM

=== ATI VGA Basic-16 (1990) ===
- PCB layout similar to VGA Integra but using cheaper RAMDAC
- Only supports the basic 60 Hz VGA modes of the IBM VGA standard from 1987
- 256KB DRAM (not upgradable)

=== ATI VGA Charger (1991) ===
- Similar to VGA Basic-16, but can be upgraded to 512KB

=== ATI VGA Wonder XL (1991) ===
- Sierra RAMDAC adds support for 15-bit colour in 640 × 480 at 72 Hz, 800 × 600 at 60 Hz
- Supports a flicker-free vertical refresh rate of 72 Hz
- 256KB, 512KB or 1MB DRAM
- Original MSRP: $229, $349, $399 respectively

=== ATI VGA Stereo·F/X ===
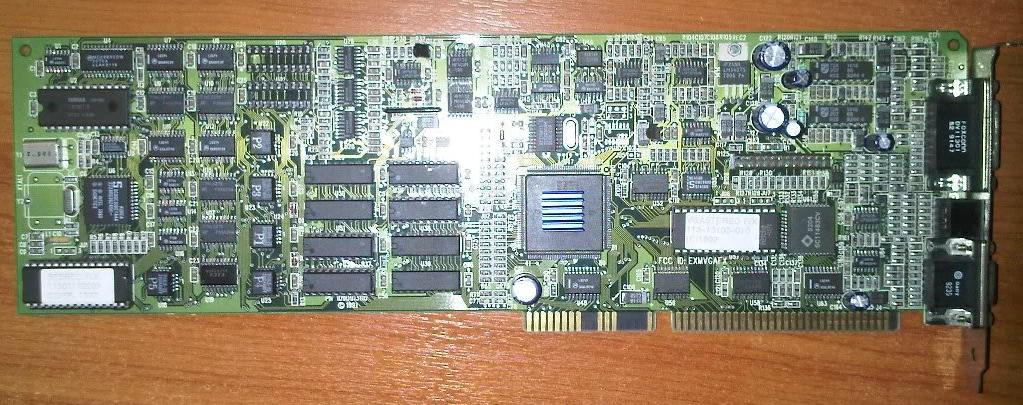
ATI VGA Stereo·F/X

- Chipset: ATI 28800
- Combines a VGA Wonder XL with a Sound Blaster 1.5
- Features "fake" stereo sound
- 512KB or 1MB DRAM

=== ATI VGA Wonder XL24 (1992) ===
- Contains a Brooktree Bt481KPJ85 RAMDAC that adds support for hi and true colour graphics modes
- 512KB or 1MB DRAM

=== ATI VGA Wonder 1024 ===
- A series of OEM cost reduced versions of several VGA Wonder models
- Typically lacks the bus mouse connector and/or the digital TTL output

== See also ==
- All-in-Wonder – ATI's line of combination graphics/TV tuner cards (which re-used the "Wonder" trademark)
- List of AMD graphics processing units
