= David E. Orton =

American engineering executive

David E. Orton (born 1955) is an American engineering executive and the CEO of GEO Semiconductor Inc.

Orton earned a BS in mathematics and economics at Wake Forest University, and a MS in electrical engineering from Duke University. He worked in the graphics and semiconductor industry as an engineer at Bell Laboratories in 1979 to 1983 and then General Electric through December 1988. He joined Silicon Graphics (SGI) in 1990, and was senior vice president of visual computing and advanced systems through 1999. In 1996 SGI bought Cray Research and Orton had to deal with merging the companies' overlapping technologies.

Orton joined ATI Technologies as a result of an acquisition of ArtX in April 2000, where he was president and CEO. ATI posted losses after the dot-com bubble collapsed, although losses were reduced by June 2001. He was named CEO of ATI in March 2004. Though ATI's principal location was in Markham, Ontario, Canada, Orton spent a portion of his time in California where he resided.

After the announced merger of Advanced Micro Devices (AMD) with ATI on July 24, 2006, as ATI Technologies became a subsidiary of AMD, Orton became an executive vice-president of AMD, reporting to AMD CEO Hector Ruiz and COO Dirk Meyer. On July 10, 2007, AMD announced the resignation of Orton as executive vice president. One trade journalist rated Orton as the top of the "CEOs that went in 2007".

From 2007 to 2009, he was CEO of the startup DSM Solutions. On July 15, 2009, Orton became the CEO of Aptina, a privately held image sensor company located in San Jose, California. He left Aptina in September 2012. He was on the board of directors of SuVolta.
