= Quick Menu =

Graphical user interface

- Developers: OSCS Software Development, Inc.
- Initial release: 1990
- Final release: 1993
- Operating system: MS-DOS
- Available in: English
- Type: User Interface
- License: Public Domain
- Website: http://annex.retroarchive.org/crescent/

Quick Menu (or QuikMenu) is a graphical user interface for MS-DOS developed by Glenn Glen Tippetts and Dave Riley of OSCS Software Development, Inc. in the early 1990's and later distributed by NeoSoft. Three versions were made: Quick Menu, Quick Menu II and Quick Menu III.

== Versions ==
=== Version I ===
Version I was released in 1990. It used a pure textual menu. The user could create some menu choices with a submenu and items which startup up a program.

=== Version II ===
This version was released in 1991. It was a real graphical interface where the user could create multiple screens. In each screen group icons and program icons could be placed together with a picture. The picture could be selected from an internal library or created with a picture editor which was part of the software. Background pictures could be set, passwords could be set on icons and main exit-command... Navigation was done by using the keyboard or a mouse.

=== Version III ===
Quick Menu III was more an expansion with more internal applications such as a calculator, file navigator and calendar. It was also possible to startup Windows 3.x-software. Actually, Quick Menu III launched Windows with the startup file of the select application as a parameter.
