= List of AMD CPU microarchitectures =

The following is a list of AMD CPU microarchitectures.

== Nomenclature ==
Historically, AMD's CPU families were given a "K-number" (which originally stood for Kryptonite, an allusion to the Superman comic book character's fatal weakness) starting with their first internal x86 CPU design, the K5, to represent generational changes. AMD has not used K-nomenclature codenames in official AMD documents and press releases since the beginning of 2005, when K8 described the Athlon 64 processor family. AMD now refers to the codename K8 processors as the Family 0Fh processors. 10h and 0Fh refer to the main result of the CPUID x86 processor instruction. In hexadecimal numbering, 0F(h) (where the h represents hexadecimal numbering) equals the decimal number 15, and 10(h) equals the decimal number 16. (The "K10h" form that sometimes pops up is an improper hybrid of the "K" code and Family XXh identifier number.)

Family number		Name
Decimal	Hex (h)	Name
05	05h	K6
06	06h	K7
15	0Fh	K8 / Hammer
16	10h	K10
17	11h	K8 & K10 "hybrid"
18	12h	K10 (Llano) / K12 (ARM-based)
20	14h	Bobcat
21	15h	Bulldozer / Piledriver / Steamroller / Excavator
22	16h	Jaguar / Puma
23	17h	Zen / Zen+ / Zen 2
24	18h	Hygon Dhyana
25	19h	Zen 3 / Zen 3+ / Zen 4
26	1Ah	Zen 5 / Zen 6

The Family hexadecimal identifier number can be determined for a particular processor using the freeware system profiling application CPU-Z, which shows the Family number in the Ext. Family field of the application, as can be seen on various screenshots on the CPU-Z Validator World Records website.

== x86 microarchitectures ==
Below is a list of microarchitectures many of which have codenames associated:

- AMD K5 – AMD's first original x86 microarchitecture. The K5 was based on the AMD 29k microarchitecture with the addition of an x86 decoder. Although the design was similar in idea to a Pentium Pro, the actual performance was more like that of a Pentium.
- AMD K6 – the K6 was not based on the K5 and was instead based on the Nx686 processor that was being designed by NexGen when that company was bought by AMD. The K6 was generally pin-compatible with the Intel Pentium (unlike NexGen's existing processors).
  - AMD K6-2 – an improved K6 with the addition of the 3DNow! SIMD instructions.
  - AMD K6-III Sharptooth – a further improved K6 with three levels of cache – 64 KB L1, 256 KB full-speed on-die L2, and a variable (up to 2 MB) L3.
- AMD K7 Athlon – microarchitecture of the AMD Athlon classic and Athlon XP microprocessors. Was a very advanced design for its day. First generation was built with a separate L2-cache chip on a board inserted into a slot (A) and introduced extended MMX. The second generation returned to the traditional socket form factor with fully integrated L2-cache running at full speed. The third generation, branded as XP, introduced full support for SSE.
- AMD K8 Hammer – also known as AMD Family 0Fh. Based on the K7 but was designed around a 64-bit ISA, added an integrated memory controller, HyperTransport communication fabric, L2 cache sizes up to 1 MB (1128 KB total cache), and SSE2. Later K8 added SSE3. The K8 was the first mainstream Windows-compatible 64-bit microprocessor and was released April 22, 2003. K8 replaced the traditional front-side bus with a HyperTransport communication fabric. SledgeHammer was the first design which implemented it.
- AMD K9 – unfinished successor to K8. The codename was recycled at least once until ultimately being dropped before any public mention of it.
- AMD Family 10h (K10) – based on the K8 microarchitecture. Shared Level 3 Cache, 128-bit floating point units, AMD-V Nested Paging virtualization, and HyperTransport 3.0 are introduced. Barcelona was the first design which implemented it.
- AMD Family 11h – combined elements of K8 and K10 designs for Turion X2 Ultra / Puma mobile platform.
- AMD Fusion Family 12h – based on the 10h/K10 design. Includes CPU cores, GPU and Northbridge in the same chip. Llano was the first design which implemented it. Fusion was later re-branded as the APU.
- AMD Bobcat Family 14h – a new distinct line, which is aimed in the 1 W to 10 W low power microprocessor category. Ontario and Zacate were the first designs which implemented it.
  - AMD Jaguar Family 16h – the successor to Bobcat. Kabini and Temash. CPUID model numbers are 00h-0Fh.
  - AMD Puma Family 16h (2nd-gen) – the successor to Jaguar. Beema and Mullins. CPUID model numbers are 30h-3Fh.
- AMD Bulldozer Family 15h – the successor to 10h/K10. Bulldozer is designed for processors in the 10 to 220 W category, implementing XOP, FMA4 and CVT16 instruction sets. Orochi was the first design which implemented it. For Bulldozer, CPUID model numbers are 00h and 01h.
  - AMD Piledriver Family 15h (2nd-gen) – second generation Bulldozer (First optimisation). CPUID model numbers are 02h (earliest "Vishera" Piledrivers) and 10h-1Fh.
  - AMD Steamroller Family 15h (3rd-gen) – third-generation Bulldozer (Second optimisation and die shrink to 28 nm). CPUID model numbers are 30h-3Fh.
  - AMD Excavator Family 15h (4th-gen) – fourth-generation Bulldozer (Final optimisation). CPUID model numbers are 60h-6Fh, later updated revisions have model numbers 70h-7Fh.
- AMD Zen – family of microarchitectures. The successor to Bulldozer. Included in the Ryzen and Epyc CPU lines.
  - AMD Zen Family 17h – first generation Zen architecture based on 14 nm process. First AMD architecture to implement simultaneous multithreading and Infinity Fabric.
  - AMD Zen+ Family 17h – revised Zen architecture (optimisation and die shrink to 12 nm).
  - AMD Zen 2 Family 17h – second generation Zen architecture based on 7 nm process, first architecture designed around chiplet technology.
  - AMD Zen 3 Family 19h – third generation Zen architecture in the optimised 7 nm process with major core redesigns.
  - AMD Zen 3+ Family 19h – 2022 revision of Zen 3 used in Ryzen 6000 mobile processors using a 6 nm process.
  - AMD Zen 4 Family 19h – fourth generation Zen architecture, in 5 nm process. Used in Ryzen 7000 consumer processors on the new AM5 platform with DDR5 and PCIe 5.0 support. Adds support for AVX-512 instruction set.
  - AMD Zen 5 Family 1Ah – fifth generation Zen architecture, in 4 nm process. Adds support for full-width AVX-512 pipeline.
  - AMD Zen 6 Family 1Ah – sixth generation Zen architecture, in 3 nm process.

== Other microarchitectures ==
- AMD Am2900 – Bit-slice architecture designed in 1975.
- AMD Am29000 – Popular line of 32-bit RISC microprocessors and microcontrollers.
- AMD K12 – ARM64/ARMv8-A

== See also ==
- List of Intel CPU microarchitectures
- List of AMD processors
- Table of AMD processors
- Speculative execution CPU vulnerabilities
