= List of AMD processors =

This article gives a list of AMD microprocessors, sorted by generation and release year. If applicable and openly known, the designation(s) of each processor's core (versions) is (are) listed in parentheses. For an overview over concrete product, you then need to consult further articles, like e.g. list of AMD accelerated processing units.

== Features overview ==
=== APUs ===
APU features table

== AMD-originated architectures ==
=== Am2900 series (1975) ===
- Am2901 4-bit-slice ALU (1975)
- Am2902 Look-Ahead Carry Generator
- Am2903 4-bit-slice ALU, with hardware multiply
- Am2904 Status and Shift Control Unit
- Am2905 Bus Transceiver
- Am2906 Bus Transceiver with Parity
- Am2907 Bus Transceiver with Parity
- Am2908 Bus Transceiver with Parity
- Am2909 4-bit-slice address sequencer
- Am2910 12-bit address sequencer
- Am2911 4-bit-slice address sequencer
- Am2912 Bus Transceiver
- Am2913 Priority Interrupt Expander
- Am2914 Priority Interrupt Controller

=== 29000 (29K) (1987–95) ===
- AMD 29000 (aka 29K) (1987)
- AMD 29005 Above without (functional) MMU and BTC
- AMD 29027 FPU
- AMD 29030
- AMD 29050 with on-chip FPU (1990)
- AMD 292xx embedded processor

== Non-x86 architecture processors ==
=== 2nd source (1974) ===
Am9080 (second source for Intel 8080)

=== 2nd source (1982) ===
Am29X305 (second source for Signetics 8X305)

=== ARM64 based Opteron Processors (2016) ===
AMD Opteron A1100 series

== x86 architecture processors ==
=== Embedded ===
- AMD Élan
- Geode

=== 2nd source (1979–91) ===
(second-sourced x86 processors produced under contract with Intel)

- 8086
- 8088
- Am286 (2nd-sourced 80286, so not a proper Amx86 member)

=== Amx86 series (1991–95) ===
- Am386 (1992)
- Am486 (1993)
- Am5x86 (1995)

=== K5 architecture (1996) ===
- AMD K5 (SSA5/5k86)

=== K6 architecture (1997–2001) ===
- AMD K6 (NX686/Little Foot) (1997)
- AMD K6-2 (Chompers/CXT)
  - AMD K6-2-P (Mobile K6-2)
- AMD K6-III (Sharptooth)
  - AMD K6-III-P
- AMD K6-2+
- AMD K6-III+

=== K7 architecture (1999–2005) ===
- Athlon (Slot A) (Argon, Pluto/Orion, Thunderbird) (1999)
- Athlon (Socket A) (Thunderbird) (2000)
- Duron (Spitfire, Morgan, Applebred) (2000)
- Athlon MP (Palomino, Thoroughbred, Barton, Thorton) (2001)
- Mobile Athlon 4 (Corvette/Mobile Palomino) (2001)
- Athlon XP (Palomino, Thoroughbred (A/B), Barton, Thorton) (2001)
- Mobile Athlon XP (Mobile Palomino) (2002)
- Mobile Duron (Camaro/Mobile Morgan) (2002)
- Sempron (Thoroughbred, Thorton, Barton) (2004)
- Mobile Sempron

== AMD64 architecture processors ==
=== K8 core architecture (2003–2014) ===
K8 series

- Opteron (SledgeHammer) (2003)
- Athlon 64 FX (SledgeHammer) (2003)
- Athlon 64 (ClawHammer/Newcastle) (2003)
- Mobile Athlon 64 (Newcastle) (2004)
- Athlon XP-M (Dublin) (2004) Note: AMD64 disabled
- Sempron (Paris) (2004) Note: AMD64 disabled
- Athlon 64 (Winchester) (2004)
- Turion 64 (Lancaster) (2005)
- Athlon 64 FX (San Diego) (1st half 2005)
- Athlon 64 (San Diego/Venice) (1st half 2005)
- Sempron (Palermo) (1st half 2005)
- Athlon 64 X2 (Manchester) (1st half 2005)
- Athlon 64 X2 (Toledo) (1st half 2005)
- Athlon 64 FX (Toledo) (2nd half 2005)
- Turion 64 X2 (Taylor) (1st half 2006)
- Athlon 64 X2 (Windsor) (1st half 2006)
- Athlon 64 FX (Windsor) (1st half 2006)
- Athlon 64 X2 (Brisbane) (2nd half 2006)
- Athlon 64 (Orleans) (2nd half 2006)
- Sempron (Manila) (1st half 2006)
- Sempron (Sparta)
- Opteron (Santa Rosa)
- Opteron (Santa Ana)
- Mobile Sempron

=== K10 core architecture (2007–2013) ===
K10 series CPUs (2007–2013)

- All Phenom and Phenom II-branded CPUs implement K10: List of AMD Phenom processors
  - Opteron (Barcelona) (10 September 2007)
  - Phenom FX (Agena FX) (Q1 2008)
  - Phenom X4 (9-series) (Agena) (19 November 2007)
  - Phenom X3 (8-series) (Toliman) (April 2008)
  - Athlon 6-series (Kuma) (February 2007)
  - Athlon 4-series (Kuma) (2008)
  - Athlon X2 (Rana) (Q4 2007)
  - Sempron (Spica)
  - Opteron (Budapest) (2008)
  - Opteron (Shanghai) (2008)
  - Opteron (Magny-Cours) (2010)
  - Phenom II (X4 on January 8, 2009, X6 on April 27, 2010)
  - Athlon II (2009)
  - Turion II (Caspian) More info (2009)

K10 series APUs (2011–2012)

- Concrete products are codenamed "Llano": List of AMD accelerated processing units.
  - Llano AMD Fusion (K10 cores + Redwood-class GPU) (launch Q2 2011, this is the first AMD APU) uses Socket FM1

=== Bulldozer architecture; Bulldozer, Piledriver, Steamroller, Excavator (2011–2017) ===
Bulldozer Series CPUs

- Concrete products codenamed Zambezi and Vishera: List of AMD FX processors
  - Zambezi (Bulldozer core) (Q4 2011)
  - Vishera (Piledriver core) (Q4 2012)
- Concrete products codenamed "Zurich", "Valencia" and "Interlagos": List of AMD Opteron processors
  - Interlagos Opteron (Bulldozer core) (Q4 2011)
- Concrete products are codenamed "Kaveri", etc.: List of AMD accelerated processing units.
  - Kaveri (Steamroller core) (Q1 2014)
  - Carrizo (Excavator core) (2015)
  - Bristol Ridge (Excavator core supporting DDR4) (2016) (and Stoney Ridge implements Zen microarchitecture but utilizes the same Socket.)

=== Low-power architecture; Bobcat, Jaguar, Puma (2011–present) ===
- All products are listed in List of AMD accelerated processing units.
  - Bobcat series APUs (2011–):
    - Ontario (Bobcat cores + Cedar-class GPU) (launch Q1 2011)
    - Zacate (Bobcat cores + Cedar-class GPU) (launch Q1 2011)
  - Jaguar series APUs (2013–)
    - Kabini (notebooks)
    - Temash (tablets)
    - Kyoto (micro-servers)
    - G-Series (embedded)
  - Puma series APUs (2014–)
    - Beema (notebooks)
    - Mullins (tablets)

=== Zen core architecture (2017–present) ===
Zen-based CPUs and some APUs use the Ryzen brand, while some APUs use the Athlon brand.

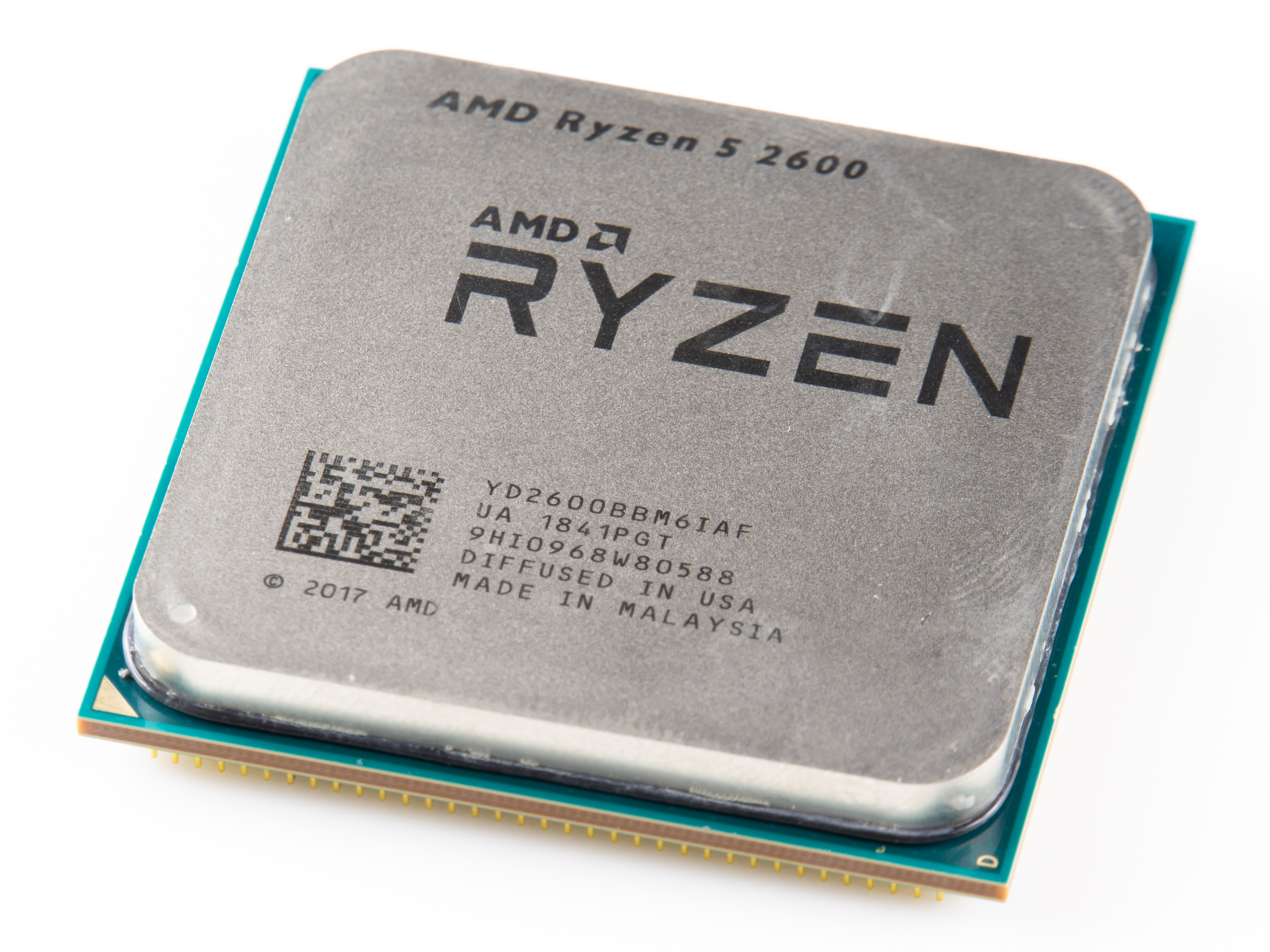
An AMD Ryzen 5 2600

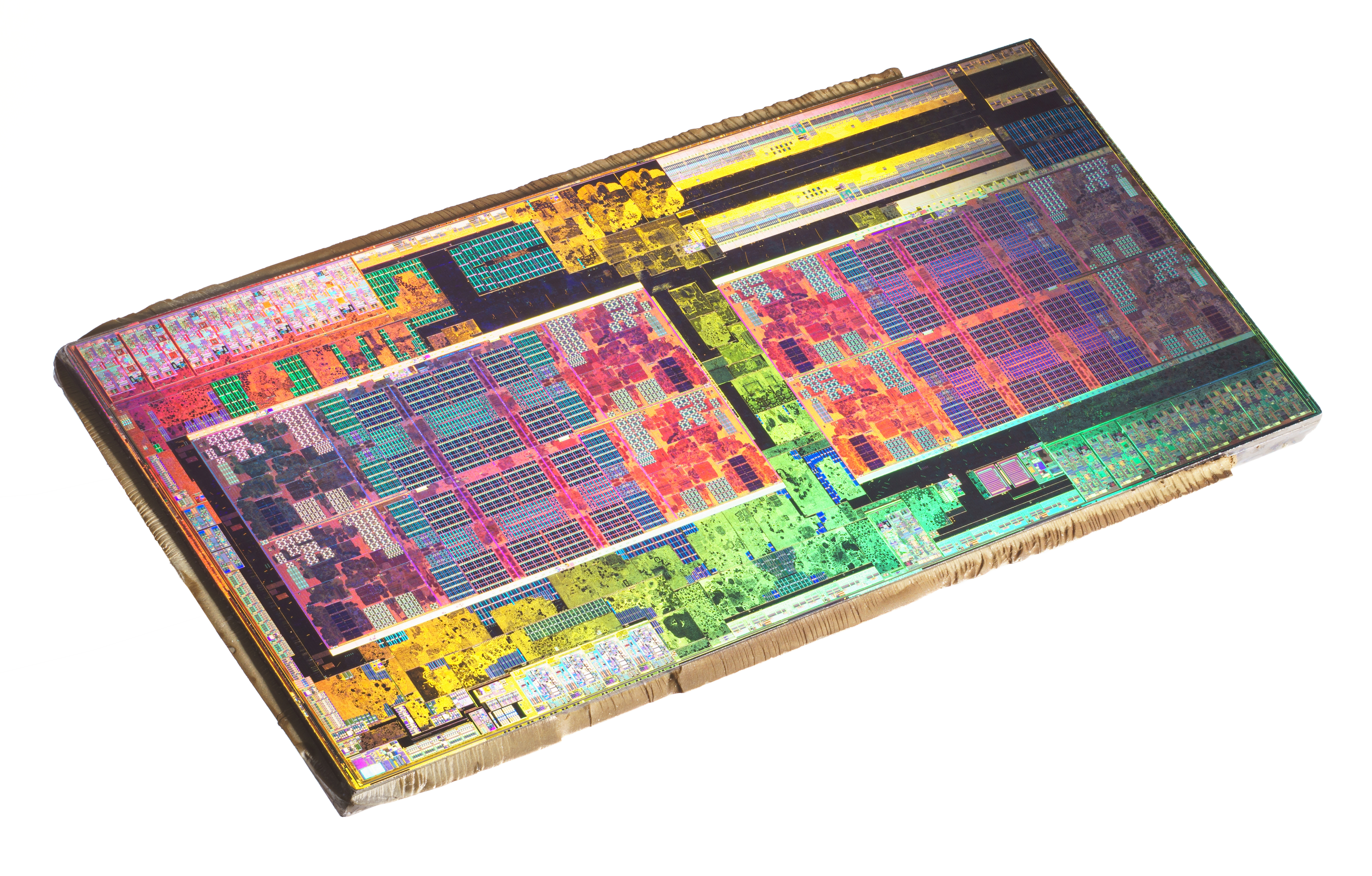
Die shot of a Ryzen 3 1200

Zen series CPUs and APUs (released 2017)

- Summit Ridge Ryzen 1000 series (desktop)
- Whitehaven Ryzen Threadripper 1000 series (desktop)
- Raven Ridge Ryzen 2000 APU series with RX Vega (desktop & laptop) and Athlon APU series with Radeon Vega (desktop & laptop)
- Dalí Ryzen 3000 APU series (laptop) and Athlon APU series (laptop)
- Naples Epyc 7001 series (server)

Zen+ series CPUs and APUs (released 2018)

- Pinnacle Ridge Ryzen 2000 series (desktop)
- Colfax Ryzen Threadripper 2000 series (desktop)
- Picasso Ryzen 3000 APU series with RX Vega (desktop & laptop) and Athlon APU series with Radeon Vega (desktop & laptop)

Zen 2 series CPUs and APUs (released 2019)

- Matisse Ryzen 3000 series (desktop)
- Castle Peak Ryzen Threadripper 3000 series (desktop)
- Renoir Ryzen 4000 APU series with RX Vega (desktop & laptop)
- Lucienne Ryzen 5000 APU series (laptop)
- Mendocino Ryzen 7020 APU series (laptop) and Athlon 7020 APU series (laptop)
- Rome Epyc 7002 series (server)

Zen 3 series CPUs and APUs (released 2020)

- Vermeer Ryzen 5000 series (desktop)
- Chagall Ryzen Threadripper 5000 series (desktop)
- Cezanne Ryzen 5000 series (desktop & laptop)
- Barceló Ryzen 5000 series (laptop)
- Barceló-R Ryzen 7030 series (laptop)
- Milan Epyc 7003 series (server)
- Milan-X Epyc 7003X series (server)

Zen 3+ series CPUs and APUs (released 2022)

- Rembrandt Ryzen 6000 series (laptop)
- Rembrandt-R Ryzen 7035 series (laptop)

Zen 4 series CPUs and APUs (released 2022)

- Raphael Ryzen 7000 series (desktop)
- Storm Peak Ryzen Threadripper 7000 series (desktop)
- Dragon Range Ryzen 7045 series (laptop)
- Phoenix Ryzen 8000 APU series (desktop) and Ryzen 7040 series (laptop)
- Hawk Point Ryzen 8040/8045 series (laptop)
- Genoa Epyc 9004 series (server)
- Genoa-X Epyc 9004X series (server)
- Bergamo Epyc 9704 series (server, Zen 4c cores)
- Siena Epyc 8004 series (server, Zen 4c cores)

Zen 5 series CPUs and APUs (released 2024)

- Granite Ridge Ryzen 9000 series (desktop)
- Strix Point Ryzen AI 300 series (laptop)
- Turin Epyc 9005 series (server)
- Turin Dense Epyc (server, Zen 5c cores)

== See also ==
- Table of AMD processors
- List of AMD chipsets
- List of AMD mobile processors
- List of AMD Athlon processors
  - List of AMD Athlon XP processors
  - List of AMD Athlon 64 processors
  - List of AMD Athlon X2 processors
- List of AMD Duron processors
- List of AMD FX processors
- List of AMD Sempron processors
- List of AMD Turion processors
- List of AMD Opteron processors
- List of AMD Phenom processors
- List of AMD processors with 3D graphics
- List of AMD Ryzen processors
- List of AMD CPU microarchitectures
- List of Intel processors
- Apple M1
