= Jim Keller (engineer) =

American computer engineer (born 1958/1959)

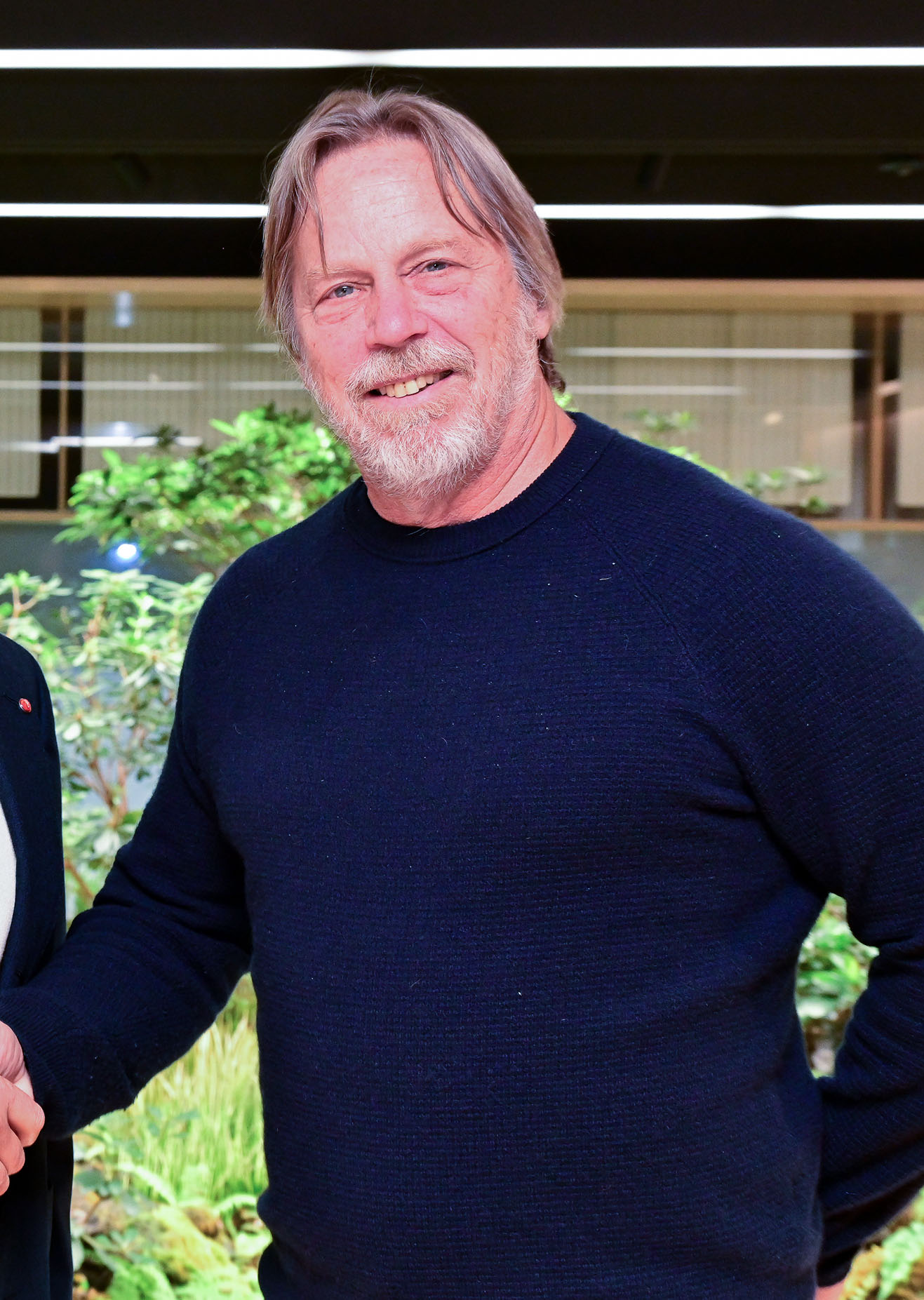
- Keller in 2024
- Born: James B. Keller; 1958 or 1959 (age 67–68); New Jersey, US
- Education: Pennsylvania State University
- Occupation: CEO at Tenstorrent
- Known for: Athlon K7; AMD K8 (lead architect); AMD K12; AMD Zen; Apple A4, A5; X86-64 (coauthor); Tesla HW 3.0; HyperTransport (coauthor)
- Spouse: Bonnie Peterson
- Relatives: Jordan Peterson (brother-in-law)

James B. Keller (born 1958/1959) is an American microprocessor engineer best known for his work at AMD, Apple, and Tesla. He was the lead architect of the AMD K8 microarchitecture (including the original Athlon 64) and was involved in designing the Athlon (K7) and Apple A4/A5 processors. He was coauthor of the specifications for the x86-64 instruction set and HyperTransport interconnect. From 2012 to 2015 he returned to AMD to work on the AMD K12 and Zen microarchitectures. He is currently the CEO of Tenstorrent, a position he assumed in January 2023. He previously held the position of CTO in the same company since 2020.

== Early life, family and education ==
Jim Keller was born in New Jersey as the second of six children. His father worked at General Electric Aerospace as a mechanical engineer, and his mother was a stay-at-home mother during his childhood then became a therapist later in life.

He graduated from Pennsylvania State University in 1980 with a B.S. in electrical engineering.

== Career ==
Jim Keller joined DEC in 1982 and worked there until 1998, where he was involved in designing a number of processors, including the VAX 8800, the Alpha 21164 and the Alpha 21264 processors. Prior to DEC, he had worked at Harris Corporation on microprocessor boards. In 1998, he moved to AMD, where he worked to launch the AMD Athlon (K7) processor and was the lead architect of the AMD K8 microarchitecture, which also included designing the x86-64 instruction set and HyperTransport interconnect, mainly used for multiprocessor communications.

In 1999, he left AMD to work at SiByte to design MIPS-based processors for 1 Gbit/s network interfaces and other devices. In November 2000 SiByte was acquired by Broadcom, where he continued as chief architect until 2004.

In 2004, he moved to serve as the Vice President of Engineering at P.A. Semi, a company specializing in low-power mobile processors. In early 2008 Keller moved to Apple. P.A. Semi was acquired by Apple shortly afterwards, reuniting Keller with his prior team from P.A. Semi. The new team worked to design the Apple A4 and A5 system-on-a-chip mobile processors. These processors were used in several Apple products, including iPhone 4 and 4S, iPad and iPad 2.

In August 2012, Keller returned to AMD, where his primary task was to lead development of new generations of x86-64 and ARM microarchitectures called Zen and K12. After years of being unable to compete with Intel in the high-end CPU market, AMD restored its ability to do just that with the new generation of Zen processors. On September 18, 2015, Keller left AMD.

In January 2016, Keller joined Tesla, Inc. as Vice President of Autopilot Hardware Engineering.

In April 2018, Keller joined Intel, where he served as Senior Vice President. He resigned from Intel in June 2020, officially citing personal reasons, though a later report said his departure was catalyzed by a dispute about whether the company should outsource more of its production.

Keller joined AI chip startup Tenstorrent as CTO in December 2020 and became its CEO in January 2023.

In 2023, Keller and Sam Zeloof founded Atomic Semi, a foundry tools company that aims to design and manufacture low-cost small scale fabrication equipment.

== Personal life ==
Jim Keller's wife Bonnie is the sister of Canadian author and clinical psychologist Jordan Peterson.
