= List of AMD K7 microprocessors =

List of AMD K7 microprocessors may refer to:

- List of AMD Athlon processors
- List of AMD Athlon XP processors
- List of AMD Duron processors
