= Zeloof =

Zeloof may refer to:

- Sam Zeloof, American electronics autodidact
- Zeloof Partnership, developers involved in Black Eagle Brewery
