= List of AMD Athlon processors =

Athlon is a family of CPUs designed by AMD, targeted mostly at the desktop market. The name "Athlon" has been largely unused as just "Athlon" since 2001 when AMD started naming its processors Athlon XP, but in 2008 began referring to single core 64-bit processors from the AMD Athlon X2 and AMD Phenom product lines. Later the name began being used for some APUs.

== Features overview ==
=== APUs ===
APU features table

== Desktop processors ==
=== Athlon (Model 1, K7 "Argon", 250 nm) ===
- L2 cache always runs with 50% of CPU speed
- All models support: MMX, Enhanced 3DNow!

Model number	Frequency	L2 cache	FSB ^{1}	Multiplier	Voltage	TDP	Socket	Release date	Order part number	Release price (USD)
Athlon 500	500 MHz	512 KB	200 MT/s	5x	1.60 V	42 W	Slot A	June 23, 1999	AMD-K7500MTR51B C	$324
Athlon 550	550 MHz	512 KB	200 MT/s	5.5x	1.60 V	46 W	Slot A	June 23, 1999	AMD-K7550MTR51B C	$479
Athlon 600	600 MHz	512 KB	200 MT/s	6x	1.60 V	50 W	Slot A	June 23, 1999	AMD-K7600MTR51B C	$699
Athlon 650	650 MHz	512 KB	200 MT/s	6.5x	1.60 V	54 W	Slot A	August 9, 1999	AMD-K7650MTR51B C	$849
Athlon 700	700 MHz	512 KB	200 MT/s	7x	1.60 V	50 W	Slot A	October 4, 1999	AMD-K7700MTR51B C	$849

=== Athlon (Model 2, K75 "Pluto/Orion", 180 nm) ===
- L2 cache runs with 50% (up to 700 MHz), 40% (up to 850 MHz) or 33% (up to 1000 MHz) of CPU speed.
- 900 - 1000 MHz have Orion designation.
- All models support: MMX, Enhanced 3DNow!

Model number	Frequency	L2 cache	FSB ^{1}	Multiplier	Voltage	TDP	Socket	Release date	Order part number	Release price (USD)
Athlon 550	550 MHz	512 KB	200 MT/s	5.5x	1.60 V	31 W	Slot A	November 29, 1999	AMD-K7550MTR51B A	
Athlon 600	600 MHz	512 KB	200 MT/s	6x	1.60 V	34 W	Slot A	November 29, 1999	AMD-K7600MTR51B A	
Athlon 650	650 MHz	512 KB	200 MT/s	6.5x	1.60 V	36 W	Slot A	November 29, 1999	AMD-K7650MTR51B A	
Athlon 700	700 MHz	512 KB	200 MT/s	7x	1.60 V	39 W	Slot A	November 29, 1999	AMD-K7700MTR51B A	
Athlon 750	750 MHz	512 KB	200 MT/s	7.5x	1.60 V	40 W	Slot A	November 29, 1999	AMD-K7750MTR52B A	$799
Athlon 800	800 MHz	512 KB	200 MT/s	8x	1.70 V	48 W	Slot A	January 6, 2000	AMD-K7800MPR52B A	
Athlon 850	850 MHz	512 KB	200 MT/s	8.5x	1.70 V	50 W	Slot A	February 11, 2000	AMD-K7850MPR52B A	$849
Athlon 900	900 MHz	512 KB	200 MT/s	9x	1.80 V	60 W	Slot A	March 6, 2000	AMD-K7900MNR53B A	$899
Athlon 950	950 MHz	512 KB	200 MT/s	9.5x	1.80 V	62 W	Slot A	March 6, 2000	AMD-K7950MNR53B A	$999
Athlon 1000	1000 MHz	512 KB	200 MT/s	10x	1.80 V	65 W	Slot A	March 6, 2000	AMD-K7100MNR53B A	$1,299

=== Athlon (Model 4, "Thunderbird", 180 nm) ===
- L2 cache always runs with full CPU speed
- All models support: MMX, Enhanced 3DNow!

Model number	Frequency	L2 cache	FSB ^{1}	Multiplier	Voltage	TDP	Socket	Release date	Order part number	Release price (USD)
Athlon 600	600 MHz	256 KB	200 MT/s	6x	1.75 V	38 W	Socket A	June 5, 2000	A0600AMT3B	
Athlon 650	650 MHz	256 KB	200 MT/s	6.5x	1.75 V	38 W	Socket A	June 5, 2000	A0650AMT3B; A0650APT3B	
Athlon 650	650 MHz	256 KB	200 MT/s	6.5x	1.70 V	36.1 W	Slot A	June 5, 2000	AMD-A0650MPR24B A	OEM
Athlon 700	700 MHz	256 KB	200 MT/s	7x	1.75 V	40 W	Socket A	June 5, 2000	A0700AMT3B; A0700APT3B	
Athlon 700	700 MHz	256 KB	200 MT/s	7x	1.70 V	38.3 W	Slot A	June 5, 2000	AMD-A0700MPR24B A	OEM
Athlon 750	750 MHz	256 KB	200 MT/s	7.5x	1.75 V	43 W	Socket A	June 5, 2000	A0750AMT3B A0750APT3B	$319
Athlon 750	750 MHz	256 KB	200 MT/s	7.5x	1.70 V	40.4 W	Slot A	June 5, 2000	AMD-A0750MPR24B A	OEM
Athlon 800	800 MHz	256 KB	200 MT/s	8x	1.75 V	45 W	Socket A	June 5, 2000	A0800AMT3B; A0800APT3B	$359
Athlon 800	800 MHz	256 KB	200 MT/s	8x	1.70 V	42.6 W	Slot A	June 5, 2000	AMD-A0800MPR24B A	OEM
Athlon 850	850 MHz	256 KB	200 MT/s	8.5x	1.75 V	47 W	Socket A	June 5, 2000	A0850AMT3B; A0850APT3B	$507
Athlon 850	850 MHz	256 KB	200 MT/s	8.5x	1.70 V	44.8 W	Slot A	June 5, 2000	AMD-A0850MPR24B A	OEM
Athlon 900	900 MHz	256 KB	200 MT/s	9x	1.75 V	50 W	Socket A	June 5, 2000	A0900AMT3B; A0900APT3B A0900DMT3B	$589
Athlon 900	900 MHz	256 KB	200 MT/s	9x	1.75 V	50 W	Slot A	June 5, 2000	AMD-A0900MMR24B A	OEM
Athlon 950	950 MHz	256 KB	200 MT/s	9.5x	1.75 V	52 W	Socket A	June 5, 2000	A0950AMT3B A0950APT3B A0950DMT3B	$759
Athlon 950	950 MHz	256 KB	200 MT/s	9.5x	1.75 V	52 W	Slot A	June 5, 2000	AMD-A0950MMR24B A	OEM
Athlon 1000B	1000 MHz	256 KB	200 MT/s	10x	1.75 V	54 W	Socket A	June 5, 2000	A1000AMS3B; A1000AMT3B A1000DMT3B	$990
Athlon 1000B	1000 MHz	256 KB	200 MT/s	10x	1.75 V	54 W	Slot A	June 5, 2000	AMD-A1000MMR24B A	OEM
Athlon 1000C	1000 MHz	256 KB	266 MT/s	7.5x	1.75 V	54 W	Socket A	October 31, 2000	A1000AMS3C; A1000AMT3C A1000DMT3C	$385
Athlon 1100	1100 MHz	256 KB	200 MT/s	11x	1.75 V	55.1/60 W	Socket A	August 14, 2000	A1100AMS3B A1100AMT3B	$853
Athlon 1133	1133 MHz	256 KB	266 MT/s	8.5x	1.75 V	63 W	Socket A	October 31, 2000	A1133AMS3C	$506
Athlon 1200B	1200 MHz	256 KB	200 MT/s	12x	1.75 V	66 W	Socket A	October 17, 2000	A1200AMS3B	$612
Athlon 1200C	1200 MHz	256 KB	266 MT/s	9x	1.75 V	66 W	Socket A	October 31, 2000	A1200AMS3C	$673
Athlon 1266	1266 MHz	256 KB	266 MT/s	9.5x	1.75 V	66 W	Socket A	March 21, 2001	A1266AMS3C	
Athlon 1300	1300 MHz	256 KB	200 MT/s	13x	1.75 V	68 W	Socket A	March 21, 2001	A1300AMS3B A1300APS3B	$318
Athlon 1333	1333 MHz	256 KB	266 MT/s	10x	1.75 V	70 W	Socket A	March 21, 2001	A1333AMS3C	$350
Athlon 1400B	1400 MHz	256 KB	200 MT/s	14x	1.75 V	72 W	Socket A	June 6, 2001	A1400AMS3B	$253
Athlon 1400C	1400 MHz	256 KB	266 MT/s	10.5x	1.75 V	72 W	Socket A	June 6, 2001	A1400AMS3C	$253

=== Athlon (Piledriver) ===
==== "Trinity" (2012) ====
- Platform "Virgo"
- 32 nm fabrication on GlobalFoundries SOI process
- Socket FM2
- CPU: Piledriver
  - L1 Cache: 16 KB Data per core and 64 KB Instructions per module
- Die Size: 246 mm^{2}, 1.303 Billion transistors
- Support for up to four DIMMs of up to DDR3-1866 memory
- 5 GT/s UMI
- Integrated PCIe 2.0 controller, and Turbo Core technology for faster CPU/GPU operation when the thermal specification permits
- MMX, SSE, SSE2, SSE3, SSSE3, SSE4a, SSE4.1, SSE4.2, AMD64, AMD-V, AES, CLMUL, AVX, XOP, FMA3, FMA4, F16C, ABM, BMI1, TBM

Model number	Released	Fab	Step.	[Modules/FPUs] Cores/threads	Clock (GHz)	Turbo (GHz)	Cache (Note: AMD in its technical documentation uses KB, which it defines as Kilobyte and as equal to 1024 bytes, and MB, which it defines as Megabyte and as equal to 1024 KB.)		DDR3 Mem.	TDP (W)	Box Number	Part number
Model number	Released	Fab	Step.	[Modules/FPUs] Cores/threads	Clock (GHz)	Turbo (GHz)	L1	L2 (MB)	DDR3 Mem.	TDP (W)	Box Number	Part number
Athlon X2 340	2012/10	32 nm	TN-A1	[1]2	3.2	3.6	64KB inst. per module 16KB data per core	1	1600	65		AD340XOKA23HJ
Athlon X4 730	2012 10/1	32 nm	TN-A1	[2]4	2.8	3.2	64KB inst. per module 16KB data per core	2× 2MB	1866	65		AD730XOKA44HJ
Athlon X4 740	2012/10	32 nm	TN-A1	[2]4	3.2	3.7	64KB inst. per module 16KB data per core	2× 2MB	1866	65	AD740XOKHJBOX	AD740XOKA44HJ
Athlon X4 750K	2012/10	32 nm	TN-A1	[2]4	3.4	4.0	64KB inst. per module 16KB data per core	2× 2MB	1866	100	AD750KWOHJBOX	AD750KWOA44HJ

=== "Richland" (2013) ===
- 32 nm fabrication on GlobalFoundries SOI process
- Socket FM2
- Two or four CPU cores based on the Piledriver microarchitecture
  - Die Size: 246 mm^{2}, 1.303 Billion transistors
  - L1 Cache: 16 KB Data per core and 64 KB Instructions per module
  - MMX, SSE, SSE2, SSE3, SSSE3, SSE4a, SSE4.1, SSE4.2, AMD64, AMD-V, AES, AVX, XOP, FMA3, FMA4, F16C, ABM, BMI1, TBM, Turbo Core 3.0, NX bit, PowerNow!

Model	Released	Fab	Step.	[Modules/FPUs] Cores/threads	Freq. (GHz)		Cache (Note: AMD in its technical documentation uses KB, which it defines as Kilobyte and as equal to 1024 bytes, and MB, which it defines as Megabyte and as equal to 1024 KB.)		DDR3 Mem.	TDP (W)	Box Number	Part number
Model	Released	Fab	Step.	[Modules/FPUs] Cores/threads	Base	Turbo	Cache		DDR3 Mem.	TDP (W)	Box Number	Part number
Model	Released	Fab	Step.	[Modules/FPUs] Cores/threads	Base	Turbo	L1	L2 (MB)	DDR3 Mem.	TDP (W)	Box Number	Part number
Athlon X2 350		32 nm	RL-A1	[1]2	3.5	3.9	64KB inst. per module 16KB data per core	1	1866	65		AD350XOKA23HL
Athlon X2 370K	Jun 2013	32 nm	RL-A1	[1]2	4.0	4.2	64KB inst. per module 16KB data per core	1	1866	65	AD370KOKHLBOX	AD370KOKA23HL
Athlon X4 750	Oct 2013	32 nm	RL-A1	[2]4	3.4	4.0	64KB inst. per module 16KB data per core	2× 2MB	1866	65		AD750XOKA44HL
Athlon X4 760K	Jun 2013	32 nm	RL-A1	[2]4	3.8	4.1	64KB inst. per module 16KB data per core	2× 2MB	1866	100	AD760KWOHLBOX	AD760KWOA44HL

=== Athlon (Jaguar) ===
==== "Kabini" (2013, SoC) ====
- 28 nm fabrication by GlobalFoundries
- Socket AM1, aka Socket FS1b (AM1 platform)
- 2 to 4 CPU Cores (Jaguar (microarchitecture))
- L1 Cache: 32 KB Data per core and 32 KB Instructions per core
- MMX, SSE, SSE2, SSE3, SSSE3, SSE4a, SSE4.1, SSE4.2, AMD64, AVX, F16C, CLMUL, AES, MOVBE (Move Big-Endian instruction), XSAVE/XSAVEOPT, ABM, BMI1, AMD-V support
- SoC with integrated memory, PCIe, 2× USB 3.0, 6× USB 2.0, Gigabit Ethernet, and 2× SATA III (6 Gb/s) controllers
- GPU based on Graphics Core Next (GCN)

Model	Released	Fab	Step.	CPU					GPU				DDR3 Memory support	TDP (W)	Box Number	Part number
Model	Released	Fab	Step.	Cores (threads)	Clock (GHz)	Cache (Note: AMD in its technical documentation uses KB, which it defines as Kilobyte and as equal to 1024 bytes, and MB, which it defines as Megabyte and as equal to 1024 KB.)			Model	Config	Clock (MHz)	Processing power (GFLOPS) (Note: Single-precision performance is calculated from the base (or boost) core clock speed based on a FMA operation.)	DDR3 Memory support	TDP (W)	Box Number	Part number
Model	Released	Fab	Step.	Cores (threads)	Clock (GHz)	L1	L2 (MB)	L3	Model	Config	Clock (MHz)	Processing power (GFLOPS)	DDR3 Memory support	TDP (W)	Box Number	Part number
Athlon X4 530	?	28 nm	A1	4 (4)	2	32 KB inst. 32 KB data per core	2	—N/a	—N/a				?	25		AD530XJAH44HM
Athlon X4 550	?	28 nm	A1	4 (4)	2.2	32 KB inst. 32 KB data per core	2	—N/a	—N/a				?	25		AD550XJAH44HM
Athlon 5150	April 9, 2014	28 nm	A1	4 (4)	1.60	32 KB inst. 32 KB data per core	2	—N/a	R3 (HD 8400)	128:8:4; 2 CU	600	153.6	1600 (Single channel only)	25	AD5150JAHMBOX	AD5150JAH44HM
Athlon 5350	April 9, 2014	28 nm	A1	4 (4)	2.05	32 KB inst. 32 KB data per core	2	—N/a	R3 (HD 8400)	128:8:4; 2 CU	600	153.6	1600 (Single channel only)	25	AD5350JAHMBOX	AD5350JAH44HM
Athlon 5370	Feb, 2016	28 nm	A1	4 (4)	2.20	32 KB inst. 32 KB data per core	2	—N/a	R3 (HD 8400)	128:8:4; 2 CU	600	153.6	1600 (Single channel only)	25		AD5370JAH44HM

=== Athlon (Steamroller, Excavator) ===
==== "Kaveri" (2014) & "Godavari" (2015) ====
- 28 nm fabrication by GlobalFoundries.
- Socket FM2+, support for PCIe 3.0.
- Two or four CPU cores based on the Steamroller microarchitecture.
  - Kaveri refresh models have codename Godavari.
- Die Size: 245 mm^{2}, 2.41 Billion transistors.
- L1 Cache: 16 KB Data per core and 96 KB Instructions per module.
- MMX, SSE, SSE2, SSE3, SSSE3, SSE4.1, SSE4.2, SSE4a, AMD64, AMD-V, AES, CLMUL, AVX, XOP, FMA3, FMA4, F16C, ABM, BMI1, TBM, Turbo Core
- Dual-channel (2× 64 Bit) DDR3 memory controller.

Model	Released	Stepping	CPU					Memory support	TDP	Part number(s)
Model	Released	Stepping	[Modules/FPUs] Cores/threads	Clock (GHz)		Cache		Memory support	TDP	Part number(s)
Model	Released	Stepping	[Modules/FPUs] Cores/threads	Base	Turbo	L1	L2	Memory support	TDP	Part number(s)
Athlon X2 450	Jul 31, 2014	KV-A1	[1] 2	3.5	3.9	96 KB inst. per module 16 KB data per core	1 MB	DDR3-1866	65 W	AD450XYBI23JA
Athlon X4 830	Feb 2015	KV-A1	[2] 4	3.0	3.4	96 KB inst. per module 16 KB data per core	2 MB per module	DDR3-2133	65 W	AD830XYBI44JA
Athlon X4 840	Aug 2014	KV-A1	[2] 4	3.1	3.8	96 KB inst. per module 16 KB data per core	2 MB per module	DDR3-2133	65 W	AD840XYBJABOX; AD840XYBI44JA
Athlon X4 850	Q2 2015	GV-A1	[2] 4	3.2		96 KB inst. per module 16 KB data per core	2 MB per module	DDR3-2133	65 W	AD850XYBI44JC
Athlon X4 860K	Aug 2014	KV-A1	[2] 4	3.7	4.0	96 KB inst. per module 16 KB data per core	2 MB per module	DDR3-2133	95 W	AD860KXBJABOX; AD860KWOHLBOX; AD860KXBJASBX; AD860KXBI44JA
Athlon X4 870K	Dec 2015	GV-A1	[2] 4	3.9	4.1	96 KB inst. per module 16 KB data per core	2 MB per module	DDR3-2133	95 W	AD870KXBJCSBX; AD870KXBI44JC
Athlon X4 880K	Mar 1, 2016	GV-A1	[2] 4	4.0	4.2	96 KB inst. per module 16 KB data per core	2 MB per module	DDR3-2133	95 W	AD880KXBJCSBX

==== "Carrizo" (2016) ====
- 28 nm fabrication by GlobalFoundries
- Socket FM2+, AM4, support for PCIe 3.0
- Two or four CPU cores based on the Excavator microarchitecture
- Die Size: 250.04 mm^{2}, 3.1 Billion transistors
- L1 Cache: 32 KB Data per core and 96 KB Instructions per module
- MMX, SSE, SSE2, SSE3, SSSE3, SSE4.1, SSE4.2, SSE4a, AMD64, AMD-V, AES, CLMUL, AVX, AVX2, XOP, FMA3, FMA4, F16C, ABM, BMI1, BMI2, TBM, RDRAND, Turbo Core
- Dual-channel DDR3 or DDR4 memory controller

Model	Released	Stepping	Socket	CPU					Memory support	TDP	Part number
Model	Released	Stepping	Socket	[Modules/FPUs] Cores/threads	Clock (GHz)		Cache		Memory support	TDP	Part number
Model	Released	Stepping	Socket	[Modules/FPUs] Cores/threads	Base	Turbo	L1	L2	Memory support	TDP	Part number
Athlon X4 835	?	CZ-A1	FM2+	[2] 4	3.1	?	96 KB inst. per module 32 KB data per core	1 MB per module	DDR3-2133 dual-channel	65 W	AD835XACI43KA
Athlon X4 845	Feb 2, 2016	CZ-A1	FM2+	[2] 4	3.5	3.8	96 KB inst. per module 32 KB data per core	1 MB per module	DDR3-2133 dual-channel	65 W	AD845XYBJCSBX (Note: Boxed part with cooler if available.); AD845XACKASBX; AD845XACI43KA

==== "Bristol Ridge" (2016) ====
- 28 nm fabrication by GlobalFoundries
- Socket AM4, support for PCIe 3.0
- Two or four "Excavator+" CPU cores
- L1 Cache: 32 KB Data per core and 96 KB Instructions per module
- MMX, SSE, SSE2, SSE3, SSSE3, SSE4.1, SSE4.2, SSE4a, AMD64, AMD-V, AES, CLMUL, AVX, AVX2, XOP, FMA3, FMA4, F16C, ABM, BMI1, BMI2, TBM, RDRAND, Turbo Core
- Dual-channel DDR4 memory controller
- PCI Express 3.0 x8 (No Bifurcation support, requires a PCI-e switch for any configuration other than x8)
- PCI Express 3.0 x4 as link to optional external chipset
- 4x USB 3.1 Gen 1
- Storage: 2x SATA and 2x NVMe or 2x PCI Express

Model	Released	Stepping	CPU						Memory support	TDP	Stock Cooler (box)	Part number(s)
Model	Released	Stepping	[Modules/FPUs] Cores/threads	Clock (GHz)		Cache			Memory support	TDP	Stock Cooler (box)	Part number(s)
Model	Released	Stepping	[Modules/FPUs] Cores/threads	Base	Turbo	L1	L2	L3	Memory support	TDP	Stock Cooler (box)	Part number(s)
Athlon X4 940	July 27, 2017	BR-A1	[2] 4	3.2	3.6	96 KB inst. per module 32 KB data per core	1 MB per module	—N/a	DDR4-2400 dual-channel	65 W	Near-silent 65 W	AD940XAGABBOX (Note: Boxed part with cooler.); AD940XAGM44AB
Athlon X4 950	July 27, 2017	BR-A1	[2] 4	3.5	3.8	96 KB inst. per module 32 KB data per core	1 MB per module	—N/a	DDR4-2400 dual-channel	65 W	Near-silent 65 W	AD950XAGABBOX; AD950XAGM44AB
Athlon X4 970	July 27, 2017	BR-A1	[2] 4	3.8	4.0	96 KB inst. per module 32 KB data per core	1 MB per module	—N/a	DDR4-2400 dual-channel	65 W	Near-silent 65 W	AD970XAUABBOX; AD970XAUM44AB

=== Athlon (Zen-based) ===
==== "Raven Ridge", 14 nm ====
- Zen CPU cores

Model	Release Date & Price	Fab	CPU						GPU				Memory support	TDP	Stock Cooler (box) (Note: A box without cooler might also be available (WOF).)	Part Number
Model	Release Date & Price	Fab	Cores/FPUs (threads)	Clock rate (GHz)		Cache (Note: AMD in its technical documentation uses KB, which it defines as Kilobyte and as equal to 1024 bytes, and MB, which it defines as Megabyte and as equal to 1024 KB.)			Model	Config (Note: Unified Shaders : Texture Mapping Units : Render Output Units and Compute Units (CU))	Clock	Processing power (GFLOPS) (Note: Single-precision performance is calculated from the base (or boost) core clock speed based on a FMA operation.)	Memory support	TDP	Stock Cooler (box)	Part Number
Model	Release Date & Price	Fab	Cores/FPUs (threads)	Base	Boost	L1	L2	L3	Model	Config	Clock	Processing power (GFLOPS)	Memory support	TDP	Stock Cooler (box)	Part Number
Athlon Pro 200GE	September 6 2018; OEM	14nm	2 (4)	3.2	—N/a	64 KB inst. 32 KB data per core	512 KB per core	4 MB	Vega 3	192:12:4; 3 CU	1000 MHz	384	DDR4-2666 dual-channel	35 W	—N/a	
Athlon 200GE	September 6 2018; US $55	14nm	2 (4)	3.2	—N/a	64 KB inst. 32 KB data per core	512 KB per core	4 MB	Vega 3	192:12:4; 3 CU	1000 MHz	384	DDR4-2666 dual-channel	35 W	Near-Silent 65W	
Athlon 220GE	December 21 2018; US $65	14nm	2 (4)	3.4	—N/a	64 KB inst. 32 KB data per core	512 KB per core	4 MB	Vega 3	192:12:4; 3 CU	1000 MHz	384	DDR4-2666 dual-channel	35 W	Near-Silent 65W	
Athlon 240GE	December 21 2018; US $75	14nm	2 (4)	3.5	—N/a	64 KB inst. 32 KB data per core	512 KB per core	4 MB	Vega 3	192:12:4; 3 CU	1000 MHz	384	DDR4-2666 dual-channel	35 W	Near-Silent 65W	
Athlon 3000G	November 19 2019	14nm	2 (4)	3.5	—N/a	64 KB inst. 32 KB data per core	512 KB per core	4 MB	Vega 3	192:12:4; 3 CU	1100 MHz	424.4	DDR4-2666 dual-channel	35 W	Near-Silent 65W	YD3000C6M2OFB

==== "Picasso", 12 nm ====
- Zen+ CPU cores

Model	Release Date & Price	Fab	CPU						GPU				Socket	PCIe lanes	Memory support	TDP	Part Number
Model	Release Date & Price	Fab	Cores (threads)	Clock rate (GHz)		Cache (Note: AMD defines 1 kilobyte (KB) as 1024 bytes, and 1 megabyte (MB) as 1024 kilobytes.)			Model	Config (Note: Unified Shaders : Texture Mapping Units : Render Output Units and Compute Units (CU))	Clock	Processing power (GFLOPS) (Note: Single-precision performance is calculated from the base (or boost) core clock speed based on a FMA operation.)	Socket	PCIe lanes	Memory support	TDP	Part Number
Model	Release Date & Price	Fab	Cores (threads)	Base	Boost	L1	L2	L3	Model	Config	Clock	Processing power (GFLOPS)	Socket	PCIe lanes	Memory support	TDP	Part Number
Athlon Pro 300GE	Sept. 30 2019; OEM	14 nm (Dali)	2 (4)	3.4	—N/a	64 KB inst. 32 KB data per core	512 KB per core	4 MB	Vega 3	192:12:4; 3 CU	1100 MHz	424.4	AM4	16 (8+4+4)	DDR4-2667 dual-channel	35 W	YD300BC6M2OFH
Athlon 320GE	Sept. 7 2019	14 nm (Dali)	2 (4)	3.5	—N/a	64 KB inst. 32 KB data per core	512 KB per core	4 MB	Vega 3	192:12:4; 3 CU	1100 MHz	424.4	AM4	16 (8+4+4)	DDR4-2667 dual-channel	35 W	YD32GEC6M2OFH
Athlon 3000G	?	14 nm (Dali)	2 (4)	3.5	—N/a	64 KB inst. 32 KB data per core	512 KB per core	4 MB	Vega 3	192:12:4; 3 CU	1100 MHz	424.4	AM4	16 (8+4+4)	DDR4-2667 dual-channel	35 W	YD3000C6M2OFH, YD3000C6FHBOX
Athlon Gold 3150GE	July 21 2020; OEM	12 nm	4 (4)	3.3	3.8	64 KB inst. 32 KB data per core	512 KB per core	4 MB	Vega 3	192:12:4; 3 CU	1100 MHz	424.4	AM4	16 (8+4+4)	DDR4-2933 dual-channel	35 W	YD3150C6M4MFH
Athlon Gold Pro 3150GE	July 21 2020; OEM	12 nm	4 (4)	3.3	3.8	64 KB inst. 32 KB data per core	512 KB per core	4 MB	Vega 3	192:12:4; 3 CU	1100 MHz	424.4	AM4	16 (8+4+4)	DDR4-2933 dual-channel	35 W	YD315BC6M4MFH
Athlon Gold 3150G	July 21 2020; OEM	12 nm	4 (4)	3.5	3.9	64 KB inst. 32 KB data per core	512 KB per core	4 MB	Vega 3	192:12:4; 3 CU	1100 MHz	424.4	AM4	16 (8+4+4)	DDR4-2933 dual-channel	45–65 W	YD3150C5M4MFH
Athlon Gold Pro 3150G	July 21 2020; OEM	12 nm	4 (4)	3.5	3.9	64 KB inst. 32 KB data per core	512 KB per core	4 MB	Vega 3	192:12:4; 3 CU	1100 MHz	424.4	AM4	16 (8+4+4)	DDR4-2933 dual-channel	45–65 W	YD315BC5M4MFH

== Mobile processors ==
=== Athlon (Zen-based) ===
==== "Raven Ridge" or "Picasso", 14/12 nm ====
- Zen and Zen+ CPU cores

Model	Release date	Fab	CPU						GPU				Socket	PCIe lanes	Memory support	TDP	Part number
Model	Release date	Fab	Cores/FPUs (threads)	Clock rate (GHz)		Cache (Note: AMD in its technical documentation uses KB, which it defines as Kilobyte and as equal to 1024 bytes, and MB, which it defines as Megabyte and as equal to 1024 KB.)			Model	Config (Note: Unified Shaders : Texture Mapping Units : Render Output Units and Compute Units (CU))	Clock	Processing power (GFLOPS) (Note: Single precision performance is calculated from the base (or boost) core clock speed based on a FMA operation.)	Socket	PCIe lanes	Memory support	TDP	Part number
Model	Release date	Fab	Cores/FPUs (threads)	Base	Boost	L1	L2	L3	Model	Config	Clock	Processing power (GFLOPS)	Socket	PCIe lanes	Memory support	TDP	Part number
Athlon Pro 200U	2019	14nm	2 (4)	2.3	3.2	64 KB inst. 32 KB data per core	512 KB per core	4 MB	Vega 3	192:12:4; 3 CU	1000 MHz	384	FP5	12 (8+4)	DDR4-2400 dual-channel	12–25 W	YM200UC4T2OFB
Athlon 300U	January 6 2019	12nm	2 (4)	2.4	3.3	64 KB inst. 32 KB data per core	512 KB per core	4 MB	Vega 3	192:12:4; 3 CU	1000 MHz	384	FP5	12 (8+4)	DDR4-2400 dual-channel	12–25 W	YM300UC4T2OFG

==== "Dalí", 14 nm ====
- Zen CPU cores

Model	Release date	Fab	CPU						GPU				Socket	PCIe lanes	Memory support	TDP	Part number
Model	Release date	Fab	Cores (threads)	Clock rate (GHz)		Cache			Model	Config (Note: Unified Shaders : Texture Mapping Units : Render Output Units and Compute Units (CU))	Clock	Processing power (GFLOPS) (Note: Single precision performance is calculated from the base (or boost) core clock speed based on a FMA operation.)	Socket	PCIe lanes	Memory support	TDP	Part number
Model	Release date	Fab	Cores (threads)	Base	Boost	L1	L2	L3	Model	Config	Clock	Processing power (GFLOPS)	Socket	PCIe lanes	Memory support	TDP	Part number
Athlon Silver 3050e	January 6, 2020	14 nm	2 (4)	1.4	2.8	64 KB inst. 32 KB data per core	512 KB per core	4 MB	AMD Radeon^{(TM)} Graphics (Vega)	192:12:4; 3 CU	1000 MHz	384	FP5	12 (8+4)	DDR4-2400 dual-channel	6 W	YM3050C7T2OFG
Athlon PRO 3045B	Q1 2021	14 nm	2 (2)	2.3	3.2	64 KB inst. 32 KB data per core	512 KB per core	4 MB	AMD Radeon^{(TM)} Graphics (Vega)	128:8:4; 2 CU	1100 MHz	281.6	FP5	12 (8+4)	DDR4-2400 dual-channel	12-25 W	YM3045C4T2OFG
Athlon Silver 3050U	January 6, 2020	14 nm	2 (2)	2.3	3.2	64 KB inst. 32 KB data per core	512 KB per core	4 MB	AMD Radeon^{(TM)} Graphics (Vega)	128:8:4; 2 CU	1100 MHz	281.6	FP5	12 (8+4)	DDR4-2400 dual-channel	12-25 W	YM3050C4T2OFG
Athlon Silver 3050C	September 22, 2020	14 nm	2 (2)	2.3	3.2	64 KB inst. 32 KB data per core	512 KB per core	4 MB	AMD Radeon^{(TM)} Graphics (Vega)	128:8:4; 2 CU	1100 MHz	281.6	FP5	12 (8+4)	DDR4-2400 dual-channel	12-25 W	YM305CC4T2OFG
Athlon PRO 3145B	Q1 2021	14 nm	2 (4)	2.6	3.3	64 KB inst. 32 KB data per core	512 KB per core	4 MB	AMD Radeon^{(TM)} Graphics (Vega)	192:12:4; 3 CU	1000 MHz	384	FP5	12 (8+4)	DDR4-2400 dual-channel	12-25 W	YM3145C4T2OFG
Athlon Gold 3150U	January 6, 2020	14 nm	2 (4)	2.6	3.3	64 KB inst. 32 KB data per core	512 KB per core	4 MB	AMD Radeon^{(TM)} Graphics (Vega)	192:12:4; 3 CU	1000 MHz	384	FP5	12 (8+4)	DDR4-2400 dual-channel	12-25 W	YM3150C4T2OFG
Athlon Gold 3150C	September 22, 2020	14 nm	2 (4)	2.6	3.3	64 KB inst. 32 KB data per core	512 KB per core	4 MB	AMD Radeon^{(TM)} Graphics (Vega)	192:12:4; 3 CU	1000 MHz	384	FP5	12 (8+4)	DDR4-2400 dual-channel	12-25 W	YM315CC4T2OFG

=== Athlon (Zen 2 based) ===
==== "Mendocino", 6 nm ====
Common features:

- Socket: FT6
- All the CPUs support LPDDR5-5500 in dual-channel mode.
- L1 cache: 64 KB (32 KB data + 32 KB instruction) per core.
- L2 cache: 512 KB per core.
- All the CPUs support 4 PCIe 3.0 lanes.
- Includes integrated RDNA2 GPU.
- Fabrication process: TSMC 6 nm FinFET.

Branding and Model		CPU					GPU		TDP	Release date
Branding and Model		Cores (threads)	Clock rate (GHz)		L3 cache (total)	Core config (Note: Core Complexes (CCX) × cores per CCX)	Model	Clock	TDP	Release date
Branding and Model		Cores (threads)	Base	Boost	L3 cache (total)	Core config	Model	Clock	TDP	Release date
Athlon Gold	7220U (Note: Model also available as Chromebook optimized version as 7220C and 7120C released on May 23, 2023)	2 (4)	2.4	3.7	4 MB	1 x 2	610M; 2 CU	1900 MHz	8–15 W	Sep 20, 2022
Athlon Silver	7120U	2 (2)	2.4	3.5	2 MB	1 x 2	610M; 2 CU	1900 MHz	8–15 W	Sep 20, 2022

== See also ==
- List of AMD processors
- List of AMD Duron processors
- List of AMD Athlon XP processors
- List of AMD Athlon 64 processors
- List of AMD Athlon X2 processors
- List of AMD Athlon II processors
- List of AMD Phenom processors
- List of AMD Opteron processors
- List of AMD Sempron processors
- List of AMD Ryzen processors
- List of Intel processors
- Table of AMD processors

== Notes ==
Note 1: Athlons use a double data rate (DDR) front-side bus, (EV-6) meaning that the actual data transfer rate of the bus is twice its physical clock rate. The FSB's true data rate, 200 or 266 MT/s, is used in the tables, and the physical clock rates are 100 and 133 MHz, respectively. The multipliers in the tables above apply to the physical clock rate, not the data transfer rate.
