= Ashawna Hailey =

American computer scientist and philanthropist

- Born: October 8, 1949; Lubbock, Texas, U.S.
- Died: October 14, 2011 (aged 62); San Jose, California, U.S.
- Education: Texas Tech University
- Occupations: Technologist, philanthropist
- Children: 2

Ashawna Hailey (October 8, 1949 – October 14, 2011) was an American computer scientist and philanthropist. She was among the creators of the HSPICE program (a commercialized version of SPICE), which many electronic design companies worldwide use to simulate the electronic circuits. Her company, Meta-Software, which was behind the commercialization of SPICE, produced compound annual growth rate in excess of 25–30 percent every year for 18 years, and had eventually become part of Synopsys, which calls HSPICE "the 'gold standard' for accurate circuit simulation".

== Early life and education ==
Hailey attended Texas Tech University along with her twin brother, Kim Hailey, starting her first company while still in college.

== Career ==
In 1973, Hailey was part of the team who created Advanced Micro Devices' first microprocessor, the Am9080, by reverse-engineering Intel 8080, and in 1974, AMD's first nonvolatile memory, the 2702 2048-bit EPROM. Earlier, she, with others, built the launch sequencer for the Sprint Anti-Ballistic Missile System for Martin Marietta.

As a philanthropist, Hailey sought to reform government policies on recreational drugs. During her life she donated to the ACLU Foundation, Code Pink, the Drug Policy Alliance, Feeding America, Rainforest Action Network, Law Enforcement Against Prohibition, the Marijuana Policy Project, Erowid, the Multidisciplinary Association for Psychedelic Studies (MAPS), and served on the board of MAPS.

== Legacy ==
After Hailey's death she left a US$10-Million bequest shared between MAPS, the ACLU, Drug Policy Alliance, Marijuana Policy Project, and Second Harvest Food Bank. In what its board considered a fitting tribute to Hailey, the Marijuana Policy Project dedicated a million dollars of her bequest to the initiative that for the first time enabled voters to legalize marijuana for recreational use in Colorado. Throughout 2010 until her death, Ashawna provided seed funding to Wild Willpower PAC.
