= Sam Zeloof =

American semiconductor engineer autodidact

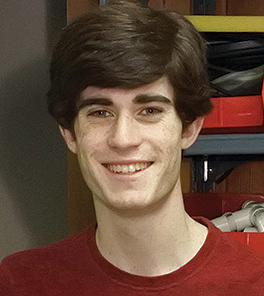
- Zeloof in 2017
- Born: 1999 or 2000 (age 25–26); New Jersey, U.S.
- Occupation: Inventor
- Known for: Homemade microchip fabrication
- Website: sam.zeloof.xyz

Sam Zeloof (born 1999 or 2000) is an American electrical engineer and entrepreneur. He is most well known for DIY microchip fabrication, having lithographically microfabricated various chips in his garage as early as the age of 17. Zeloof is currently CEO of his company fab2, Inc. which builds tools for small semiconductor fabs.

== Education ==
Zeloof attended Hunterdon Central Regional High School. He then went to Carnegie Mellon University where he studied electrical engineering between 2018 and 2022.

== Career ==
At the age of 17, self-taught with help from his father, Zeloof constructed a home microchip fabrication facility in his parents' garage. In 2018, he produced the first homebrew lithographically fabricated microchip, the Zeloof Z1, a PMOS dual differential amplifier chip. In 2021, he achieved a transistor count of 100 with the creation of the Zeloof Z2, a transistor array.

His work takes partial inspiration from Jeri Ellsworth's "Cooking with Jeri" which demonstrates a homebrew transistor and logic gate fabrication process. His photolithography process is currently able to create details as small as 300 nanometers.

In 2022, Zeloof along with Jim Keller founded fab2, Inc., a startup to manufacture small batches of affordable microchips quickly.

Zeloof also has a considerable online presence with a YouTube channel focusing on microchip and semiconductor manufacturing.
