= AMD Am9080 =

AMD's version of the Intel 8080

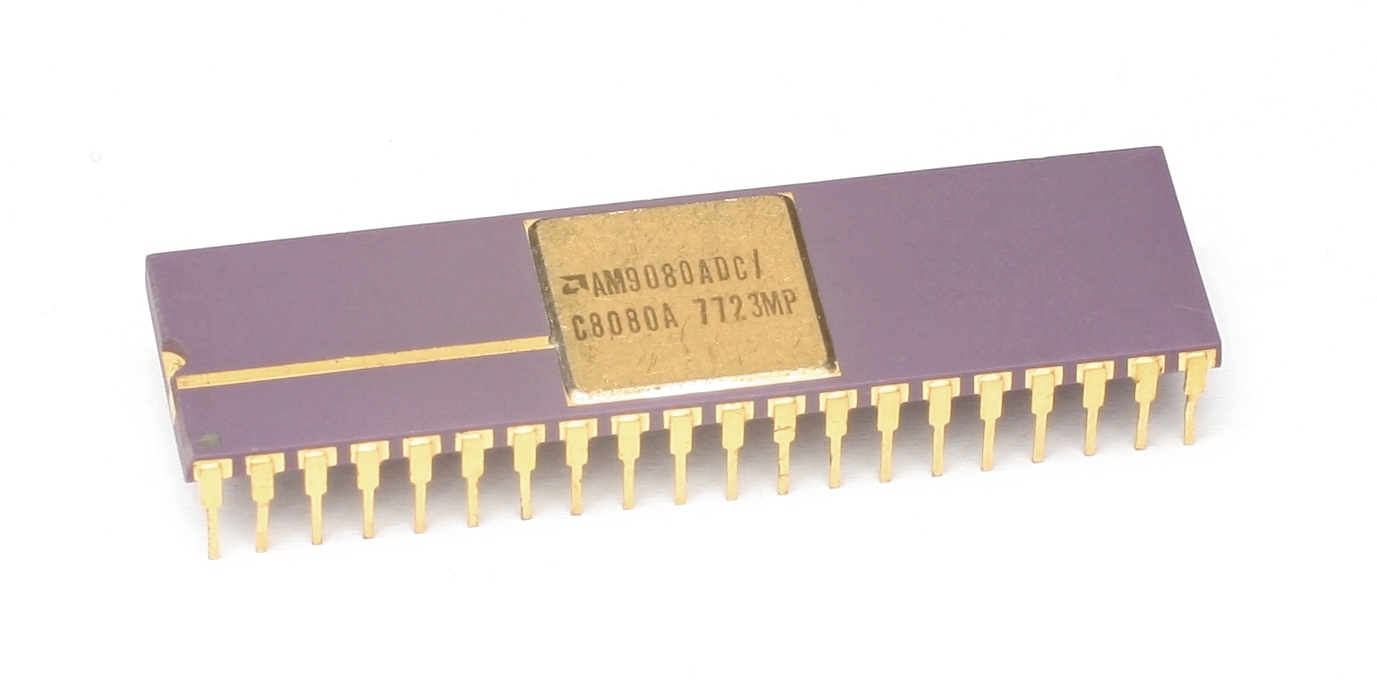

General information
- Launched: 1975
- Marketed by: AMD
- Designed by: Intel
- Common manufacturer: AMD

Performance
- Max. CPU clock rate: 2 MHz to 4 MHz
- Data width: 8 bits
- Address width: 16 bits

Physical specifications
- Transistors: 4,500 or 6000
- Cores: 1
- Package: 40-pin DIP
- Socket: DIP40

Architecture and classification
- Technology node: 6 µm
- Instruction set: 8080

History
- Successor: Am8086

Support status
- Unsupported

The Am9080 was a CPU manufactured by AMD. Originally produced without license as a clone of the Intel 8080, the processor was reverse-engineered by Ashawna Hailey, Kim Hailey and Jay Kumar. The Haileys photographed a pre-production sample Intel 8080 on their last day in Xerox, and developed a schematic and logic diagrams from the ~400 images. It was in the summer of 1973. They went to Silicon Valley to see if anyone was interested. AMD was interested since they had just developed a N-channel MOS process. In initial production, the chips cost about 50 cents to make, yielding 100 chips per wafer, and were sold into the military market for $700 each. This CPU operated at a speed of 2 MHz. Later, an agreement was made with Intel to become a licensed second source for the 8080, enabling both manufacturers' chips to break into markets that would not accept a single-sourced part.

There are 13 variants in the Am9080 family, with clock period ranging from 250 ns to 480 ns. They were also named 8080A.

It was used in AMC 95/4000, result of a joint venture with Siemens.
