= Bobcat (microarchitecture) =

Computer microarchitecture created by AMD

Bobcat - Family 14h
General information
- Launched: early 2011
- Discontinued: present
- Common manufacturer: AMD

Physical specifications
- Socket: Socket FT1 (BGA-413)

Architecture and classification
- Technology node: 40 nm
- Instruction set: AMD64 (x86-64)

Products, models, variants
- Core name: AMD APU

History
- Successor: Jaguar - Family 16h

The AMD Bobcat Family 14h is a microarchitecture created by AMD for its AMD APUs, aimed at a low-power/low-cost market.

It was revealed during a speech from AMD executive vice-president Henri Richard in Computex 2007 and was put into production Q1 2011. One of the major supporters was executive vice-president Mario A. Rivas who felt it was difficult to compete in the x86 market with a single core optimized for the 10–100 W range and actively promoted the development of the simpler core with a target range of 1–10 W. In addition, it was believed that the core could migrate into the hand-held space if the power consumption can be reduced to less than 1 W.

Bobcat cores are used together with GPU cores in accelerated processing units (APUs) under the "Fusion" brand. A simplified architecture diagram was released at AMD's Analyst Day in November 2009. This is similar in concept with earlier AMD research in 2003, detailing the specifications and advantages of extending x86 "everywhere".

== Design ==
The Bobcat x86 CPU core design has since been completed and implemented in AMD APU processor products with a TDP of 18 W or less. The core is targeted at low-power markets like netbooks/nettops, ultra-portable laptops, consumer electronics and the embedded market. Since its launch, Bobcat-based CPUs have also been used by OEMs on larger laptops. Architecture specifics:

- 64-bit core
- Out-of-order execution
- Advanced branch predictor
- Dual x86 instruction decoder
- 64-bit integer unit with two ALUs
- Floating-point unit with two 64-bit pipes
- Single channel 64-bit memory controller
- 32 KiB instruction + 32 KiB data L1 cache
- 512 KiB - 1 MiB L2 cache
- MMX, SSE, SSE2, SSE3, SSSE3, SSE4A, ABM

In February 2013, AMD detailed plans for a successor to Bobcat codenamed Jaguar.

== Features ==
APU features table

== Processors ==
In January 2011 AMD introduced several processors that have implemented the Bobcat core. This core is in the following AMD Accelerated Processors:

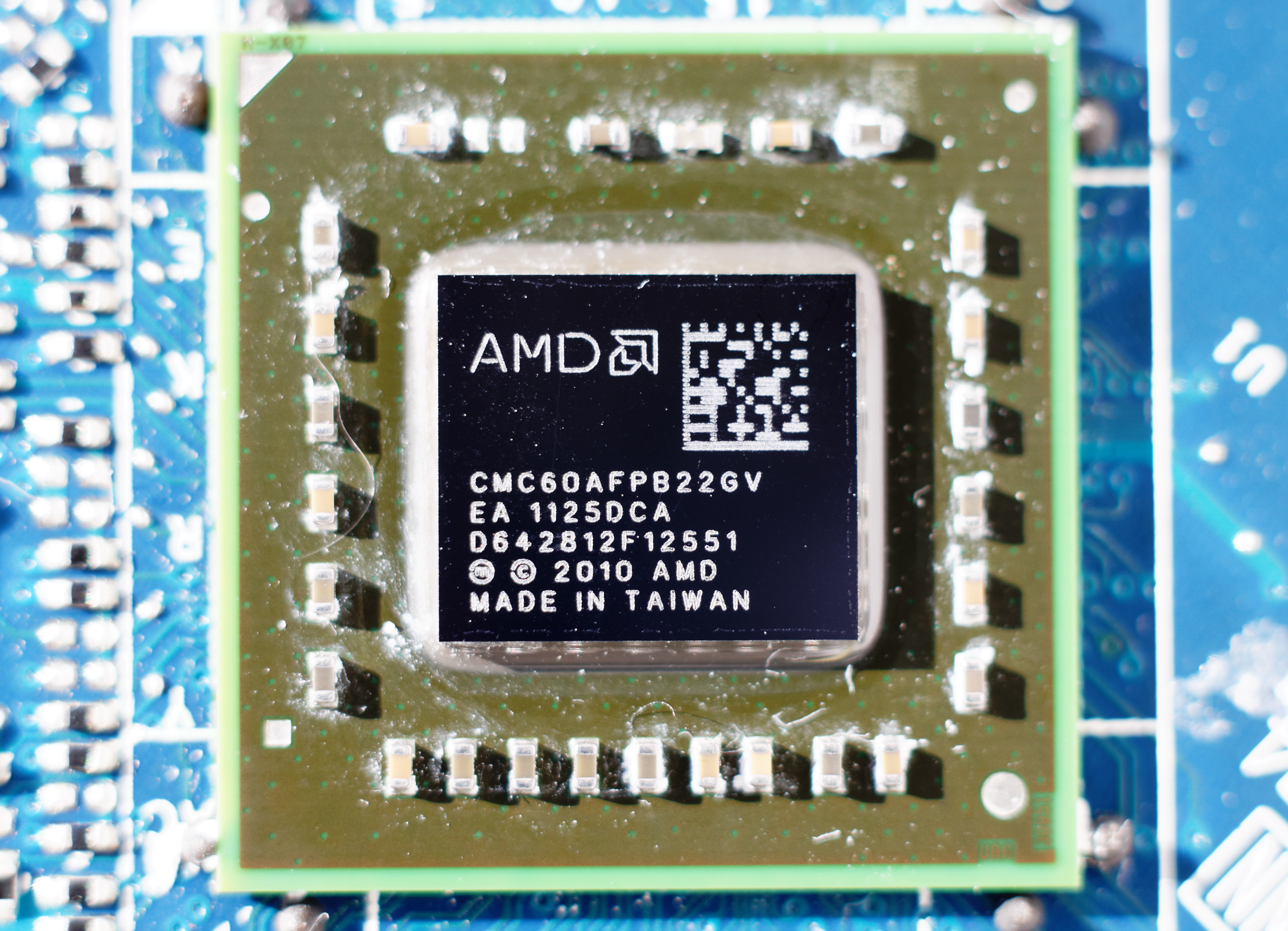
AMD C-60

Series ^	Model	CPU clock (MHz)	CPU cores	TDP (W)	L2 cache (KiB)	Radeon cores	GPU clock (MHz)	DirectX version	UVD	DDR3 speed
C-Series	C-30	1000	1	9	512	80	277	11	UVD 3	1066
C-Series	C-50	1000	2	9	2*512	80	276	11	UVD 3	1066
C-Series	C-60	1000/1333 (turbo)	2	9	2*512	80	276/400 (turbo)	11	UVD 3	1066
C-Series	C-70	1000/1333 (turbo)	2	9	2*512	80	276/400 (turbo)	11	UVD 3	1066
E-Series	E-240	1500	1	18	512	80	500	11	UVD 3	1066
E-Series	E-300	1300	2	18	2*512	80	500	11	UVD 3	1066
E-Series	E-350	1600	2	18	2*512	80	492	11	UVD 3	1066
E-Series	E-450	1650	2	18	2*512	80	508/600 (turbo)	11	UVD 3	1333
E-Series	E1-1200	1400	2	18	2*512	80	500	11	UVD 3	1066
E-Series	E1-1500	1480	2	18	2*512	80	529	11	UVD 3	1066
E-Series	E2-1800	1700	2	18	2*512	80	523/680	11	UVD 3	1333
E-Series	E2-2000	1750	2	18	2*512	80	538/700	11	UVD 3	1333
G-Series	T-24L	800	1	5	512	80	?			1066
G-Series	T-30L	1400	1	18	512	80	?			1333
G-Series	T-40N	1000	2	9	2*512	80	276	11	UVD 3	1066
G-Series	T-44R	1200	1	9	512	80	276	11	UVD 3	1066
G-Series	T-48E	1400	2	18	2*512	80	280	11	UVD 3	1066
G-Series	T-48L	1400	2	18	2*512	80	?			1066
G-Series	T-48N	1400	2	18	2*512	80	492	11	UVD 3	1066
G-Series	T-52R	1500	1	18	512	80	492	11	UVD 3	1066
G-Series	T-56N	1600	2	18	2*512	80	492	11	UVD 3	1066
Z-Series	Z-01	1000	2	5.9	2*512	80	276	11	UVD 3	1066
Z-Series	Z-60	1000	2	4.5	2*512	80	275	11	UVD 3	1066

^ E-Series & C-Series are standard parts, G-Series are embedded parts

== See also ==
- Bulldozer, a new core for the 10 to 125 Watt TDP range.
- List of AMD processors with 3D graphics
