= AMD K12 =

2017 unreleased computer chip design

K12
General information
- Launched: Never released (Planned 2017)
- Designed by: AMD

Architecture and classification
- Technology node: 14 nm FinFET
- Instruction set: ARM64 (ARMv8-A)

History
- Predecessor: A1100 series

K12 was to be AMD's first custom microarchitecture based on the ARMv8-A (AArch64) instruction set with a planned release in 2017. Its predecessor, the Opteron A1100 series, also ARMv8-A, used ARM Cortex-A57 cores. As of 2023 the product has officially been canceled.

The microarchitecture was to focus on high frequency and power efficiency and was to target the dense server, embedded and semi-custom market segments.

== See also ==
- Zen (microarchitecture)
