= Slot A =

CPU socket for AMD Athlon Classic CPUs

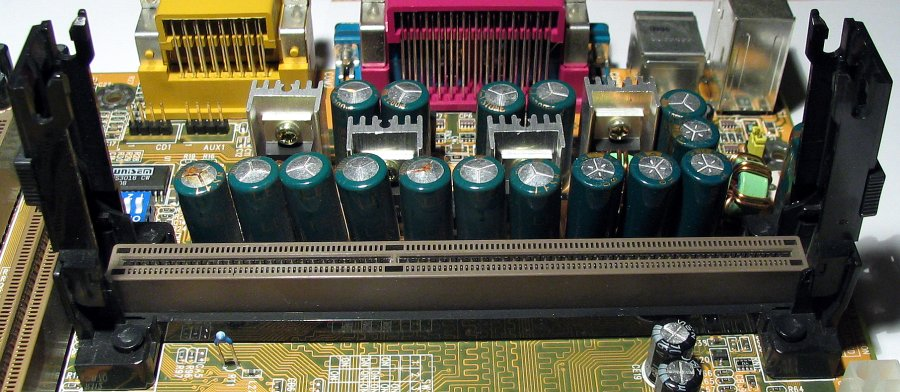
- Type: SECC
- Chip form factors: PGA
- Contacts: 242
- FSB protocol: EV6
- FSB frequency: 200 MT/s, 266 MT/s
- Voltage range: 1.3–2.05 V
- Processors: AMD Athlon (500–1000 MHz)
- Predecessor: Super Socket 7
- Successor: Socket A
- This article is part of the CPU socket series

Slot A is the physical and electrical specification for a 242-lead single-edge-connector used by early versions of AMD's Athlon processor.

The Slot A connector allows for a higher bus rate than Socket 7 or Super Socket 7. Slot A motherboards use the EV6 bus protocol, a technology originally developed by Digital Equipment Corporation (DEC) for its Alpha 21264 microprocessor.

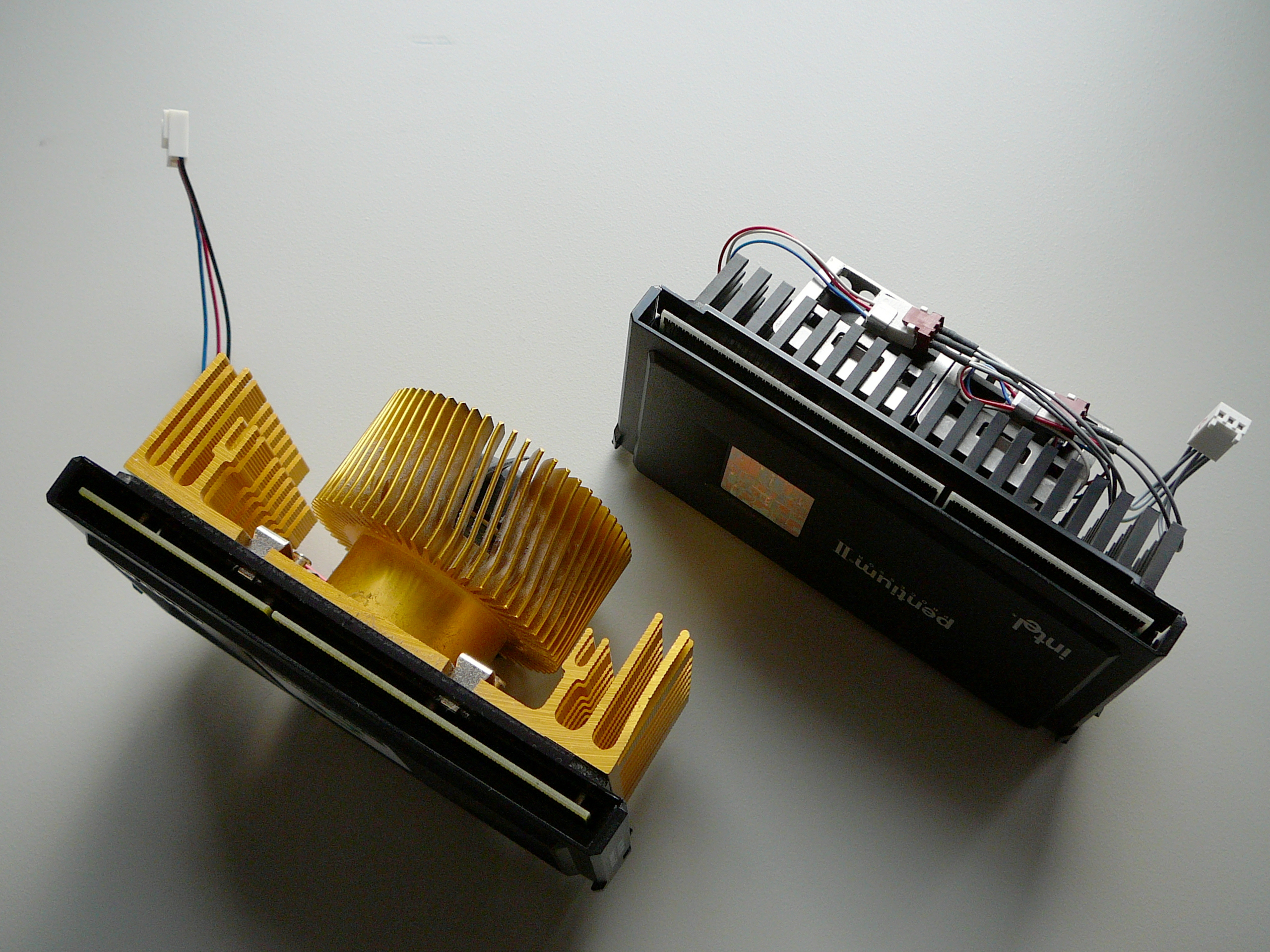
A Slot A CPU on the left compared to a Slot 1 CPU (connector rotated by 180 degrees)

Slot A is mechanically compatible but electrically incompatible with Intel's Slot 1. As a consequence, Slot A motherboards were designed to have the connector's installed orientation be rotated 180 degrees relative to Slot 1 motherboards to discourage accidental insertion of a Slot 1 processor into a Slot A motherboard, and vice versa. The choice to use the same mechanical connector as the Intel Slot 1 also allowed motherboard manufacturers to keep costs down by stocking the same part for both Slot 1 and Slot A assemblies.

Unlike with Slot 1 CPUs, there were never any converter cards, or slotkets made that allowed Socket A CPUs to be used on Slot A motherboards, as what happened with the slotkets made for using Socket 370 CPUs in Slot 1 motherboards.

AMD went back into using a traditional socket interface with Socket A in 2000.

== Chipsets ==
AMD offered official chipsets for the Slot A CPUs. These are included in the table below.

Model	Code name	Released	CPU support	FSB/HT (MHz)	Southbridge	Features / Notes
AMD-750 chipset	AMD-751	August 1999	Athlon, Duron (Slot A, Socket A), Alpha 21264	100 (200MT/s)	AMD-756, VIA-VT82C686A	AGP 2×, SDRAM; Irongate chipset family; early steppings had issues with AGP 2×; drivers often limited support to AGP 1×; later fixed with "super bypass" memory access adjustment.

Third-party chipsets includes a large number of VIA K-series chipsets.

In practice, third-party chipsets were heavily favoured by motherboard manufacturers. Stability problems and compatibility quirks from these chipsets abounded from manufacturers not following chipset designers' guidelines. This caused long-lasting damage to AMD's reputation, despite AMD having nothing to do with the poorly-realised hardware. A similar incident happened with third-party chipsets for Super Socket 7 CPUs, of which AMD tried to remedy it by putting quality assurance measures for the Athlon, which used Slot A CPUs. Despite this, however, this was not enough to prevent the aforementioned problems mentioned above, and this phenomenon still lingered on for quite a while, even for Athlon CPUs.

== See also ==
- List of AMD processors
