= List of AMD Duron processors =

== Desktop processors ==
=== Duron "Spitfire" (Model 3, 180 nm) ===
- All models support: MMX, Enhanced 3DNow!

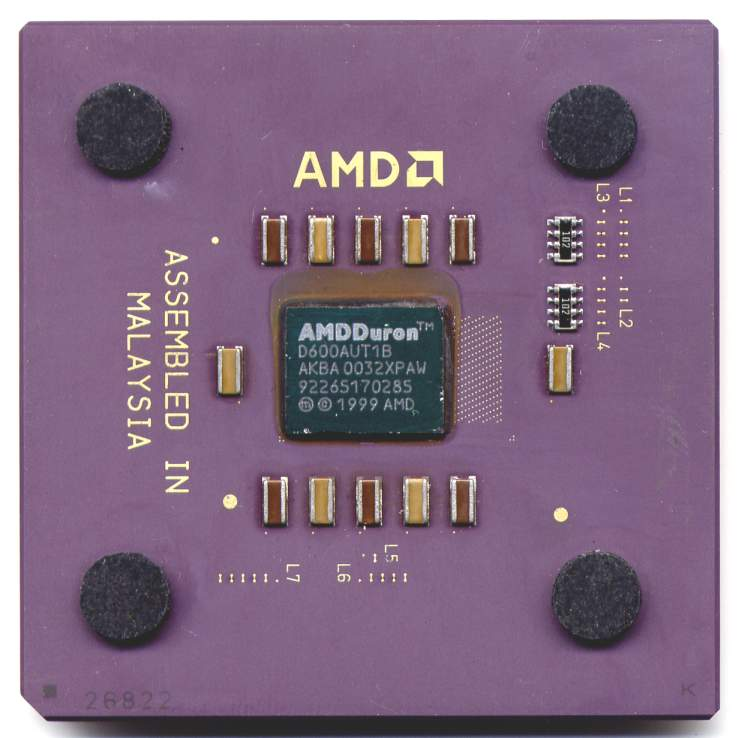
Duron 600

Model number	Frequency	L2-Cache	FSB (Note: Durons use a double data rate (DDR) front-side bus, meaning that the actual data transfer rate of the bus is twice its physical clock rate. The FSB's true data rate, 200 or 266 MT/s, is used in the tables, and the physical clock rates are 100 and 133 MHz, respectively. The multipliers in the tables above apply to the physical clock rate, not the true data transfer rate.)	Multiplier	Voltage	TDP	Release date	Release price	Order part number
Duron 600	600 MHz	64 KB	200 MT/s	6x	1.6 V	27.4 W	June 19, 2000	$112	D600AUT1B
Duron 650	650 MHz	64 KB	200 MT/s	6.5x	1.6 V	29.4 W	June 19, 2000	$154	D650AUT1B
Duron 700	700 MHz	64 KB	200 MT/s	7x	1.6 V	31.4 W	June 19, 2000	$192	D700AUT1B
Duron 750	750 MHz	64 KB	200 MT/s	7.5x	1.6 V	33.4 W	September 5, 2000	$181	D750AUT1B
Duron 800	800 MHz	64 KB	200 MT/s	8x	1.6 V	35.4 W	October 17, 2000	$170	D800AUT1B
Duron 850	850 MHz	64 KB	200 MT/s	8.5x	1.6 V	37.4 W	January 8, 2001	$149	D850AUT1B
Duron 900	900 MHz	64 KB	200 MT/s	9x	1.6 V	39.5 W	April 2, 2001	$129	D900AUT1B
Duron 950	950 MHz	64 KB	200 MT/s	9.5x	1.6 V	41.5 W	June 6, 2001	$122	D950AUT1B

=== Duron "Morgan" (Model 7, 180 nm) ===
AMD Duron K7 die shot, order part number DHD1300AMT1B

- All models support: MMX, SSE, Enhanced 3DNow!

Model number	Frequency	L2-Cache	FSB	Multiplier	Voltage	TDP	Release date	Release price	Order part number
Duron 900	900 MHz	64 KB	200 MT/s	9x	1.75 V	42.7 W	May 14, 2001	N/A	DHD900AMT1B
Duron 950	950 MHz	64 KB	200 MT/s	9.5x	1.75 V	44.4 W	July 2001	N/A	DHD950AMT1B
Duron 1000	1000 MHz	64 KB	200 MT/s	10x	1.75 V	46.1 W	August 20, 2001	$89	DHD1000AMT1B
Duron 1100	1100 MHz	64 KB	200 MT/s	11x	1.75 V	50.3 W	October 1, 2001	$103	DHD1100AMT1B
Duron 1200	1200 MHz	64 KB	200 MT/s	12x	1.75 V	54.7 W	November 15, 2001	$103	DHD1200AMT1B
Duron 1300	1300 MHz	64 KB	200 MT/s	13x	1.75 V	60 W	January 21, 2002	$118	DHD1300AMT1B

=== Duron "Applebred" (Model 8, 130 nm) ===
- All models support: MMX, Extended MMX, SSE, 3DNow!, Enhanced 3DNow!

Model number	Frequency	L2-Cache	FSB	Multiplier	Voltage	TDP	Release date	Order part number
Duron 1400	1400 MHz	64 KB	266 MT/s	10.5x	1.5 V	57 W	August 21, 2003	DHD1400DLV1C
Duron 1600	1600 MHz	64 KB	266 MT/s	12x	1.5 V	57 W	August 21, 2003	DHD1600DLV1C
Duron 1800	1800 MHz	64 KB	266 MT/s	13.5x	1.5 V	57 W	August 21, 2003	DHD1800DLV1C

== Mobile processors ==
=== Mobile Duron "Spitfire" (Model 3, 180 nm) ===
- All models support: MMX, Enhanced 3DNow!

Model number	Frequency	L2-Cache	FSB	Multiplier	Voltage	Release date	Order part number
Mobile Duron 600	600 MHz	64 KB	200 MT/s	6x	1.4 V	January 15, 2001	DM600AVS1B
Mobile Duron 700	700 MHz	64 KB	200 MT/s	7x	1.4 V	January 15, 2001	DM700AVS1B

=== Mobile Duron "Camaro" (Model 7, 180 nm) ===
- All models support: MMX, SSE, Enhanced 3DNow!

Model number	Frequency	L2-Cache	FSB	Multiplier	Voltage	TDP	Release date	Order part number
Mobile Duron 800	800 MHz	64 KB	200 MT/s	8x	1.50 V	25 W	May 14, 2001	DHM0800ALS1B
Mobile Duron 850	850 MHz	64 KB	200 MT/s	8.5x	1.50 V	25 W	May 14, 2001	DHM0850AVS1B
Mobile Duron 900	900 MHz	64 KB	200 MT/s	9x	1.50 V	25 W	August 20, 2001	DHM0900AQS1B
Mobile Duron 950	950 MHz	64 KB	200 MT/s	9.5x	1.50 V	25 W	November 12, 2001	DHM0950AQS1B
Mobile Duron 1000	1000 MHz	64 KB	200 MT/s	10x	1.50 V	25 W	December 17, 2001	DHM1000AVS1B
Mobile Duron 1100	1100 MHz	64 KB	200 MT/s	11x	1.50 V	25 W	January 30, 2002	DHM1100AHQ1B
Mobile Duron 1200	1200 MHz	64 KB	200 MT/s	12x	1.50 V	25 W	January 30, 2002	DHM1200AQQ1B
Mobile Duron 1300	1300 MHz	64 KB	200 MT/s	13x	1.50 V	25 W	January 30, 2002	DHM1300ALQ1B

== See also ==
- Duron
- List of AMD microprocessors
- Table of AMD processors
