= List of VIA C3 microprocessors =

The C3 microprocessor from VIA Technologies is a fifth-generation CPU targeted at the desktop and mobile markets.

== Desktop processors ==
=== C3 ===
==== "Samuel 2" (150 nm) ====
- All models support: MMX, 3DNow!, LongHaul
- FPU runs at 50% of core speed

Model number	Frequency	L2-Cache	Front Side Bus	Multiplier	Voltage	TDP	Socket	Release date	Part number(s)
C3 667	667MHz	64KB	133MHz	5×	1.6V	2.5W	Socket 370	2001	
C3 733	733MHz	64KB	133MHz	5.5×	1.6V	10.35W	Socket 370	March 25, 2001	
C3 750	750MHz	64KB	100MHz	7.5×	1.6V	10.59W	Socket 370	May 28, 2001	
C3 800	800MHz	64KB	100MHz	8×	1.6V	11.3W	Socket 370	2001	
C3 800	800MHz	64KB	133MHz	6×	1.6V	13W	EBGA		

==== "Ezra"/"Ezra-T" (130 nm) ====
- All models support: MMX, 3DNow!, LongHaul
- FPU runs at 50% of core speed

Model number	Frequency	L2-Cache	Front Side Bus	Multiplier	Voltage	TDP	Socket	Release date	Part number(s)
C3 800	800MHz	64 KB	100MHz	8×	1.35V	W	Socket 370	June 5, 2001	
C3 800	800MHz	64 KB	133MHz	6×	1.35V	8.3W	Socket 370	June 5, 2001	
C3 800T	800MHz	64KB	133MHz	6×	1.35V	W	Socket 370		
C3 850	850MHz	64KB	100MHz	8.5×	1.35V	9W	Socket 370	2001	
C3 866	866 MHz	64 KB	133MHz	6.5×	1.35V	9.2W	Socket 370	September 11, 2001	
C3 866T	866 MHz	64 KB	133MHz	6.5×	1.35V	9.2W	Socket 370	September 11, 2001	
C3 900	900MHz	64KB	100MHz	9×	1.35V	9.4W	Socket 370	2001	
C3 933T	933MHz	64KB	133MHz	7×	1.35V	10W	Socket 370	December 19, 2001	
C3 1.0A	1000MHz	64KB	100MHz	10.0×	1.45V	~10W	Socket 370	Unknown	
C3 1.0	1000MHz	64KB	133MHz	7.5×	1.35V	W	Socket 370	June 3, 2002	

==== "Nehemiah" (130 nm) ====
- All models support: MMX, SSE, VIA PadLock (AES, RNG), LongHaul

Model number	Frequency	L2-Cache	Front Side Bus	Multiplier	Voltage	TDP	Socket	Release date	Part number(s)
C3 1.0A	1000 MHz	64 KB	133 MHz	7.5×	1.4 V	15 W	Socket 370	January 22, 2003	
C3 1.0B	1000 MHz	64 KB	133 MHz	7.5×	1.45 V	15 W	EBGA	January 22, 2003	
C3 1.1A	1133 MHz	64 KB	133 MHz	8.5×	1.4 V	16 W	Socket 370		
C3 1.1B	1133 MHz	64 KB	133 MHz	8.5×	1.45 V	16 W	EBGA		
C3 1.2A	1200 MHz	64 KB	133 MHz	9×	1.45 V	17 W	Socket 370		
C3 1.2B	1200 MHz	64 KB	133 MHz	9×	V	17 W	EBGA		
C3 1.2C	1200 MHz	64 KB	200 MHz	6×	V	17 W	EBGA		
C3 1.3A	1333 MHz	64 KB	133 MHz	10×	1.4 V	19 W	Socket 370		
C3 1.3B	1333 MHz	64 KB	133 MHz	10×	V	19 W	EBGA		
C3 1.3C	1300 MHz	64 KB	200 MHz	6.5×	V	19 W	EBGA		
C3 1.4A	1400 MHz	64 KB	133 MHz	10.5×	1.4 V	21 W	Socket 370		
C3 1.4B	1400 MHz	64 KB	133 MHz	10.5×	V	21 W	EBGA		
C3 1.4C	1400 MHz	64 KB	200 MHz	7×	V	21 W	EBGA		

== Mobile processors ==
=== C3-M ===
==== "Ezra"/"Ezra-T" (130 nm) ====
- All models support: MMX, 3DNow!, LongHaul
- FPU runs at 50% of core speed

Model number	Frequency	L2-Cache	Front Side Bus	Multiplier	Voltage	TDP	Socket	Release date	Part number(s)
C3-M 933	933 MHz	64 KB	133 MHz	7×	1.35 V	W	mFCPGA	March 14, 2002	

==== "Nehemiah" (130 nm) ====
- All models support: MMX, SSE, VIA PadLock (AES, RNG)
- VIA PowerSaver supported

Model number	Frequency	L2-Cache	Front Side Bus	Multiplier	Voltage	TDP	Socket	Release date	Part number(s)
C3-M 1.0B	1000 MHz	64 KB	133 MHz	7.5×	1.25 V	11 W	EBGA	July 8, 2003	
C3-M 1.1B	1133 MHz	64 KB	133 MHz	8.5×	1.25 V	12 W	EBGA		
C3-M 1.2B	1200 MHz	64 KB	133 MHz	9×	1.25 V	12 W	EBGA		
C3-M 1.2C	1200 MHz	64 KB	200 MHz	6×	1.45 V	12 W	EBGA		
C3-M 1.3B	1333 MHz	64 KB	133 MHz	10×	1.45 V	18 W	EBGA		
C3-M 1.3C	1300 MHz	64 KB	200 MHz	6.5×	1.45 V	18 W	EBGA		
C3-M 1.4B	1400 MHz	64 KB	133 MHz	10.5×	1.45 V	19 W	EBGA		
C3-M 1.4C	1400 MHz	64 KB	200 MHz	7×	1.45 V	19 W	EBGA		

== See also ==
- List of VIA microprocessors
