= List of VIA Eden microprocessors =

The Eden microprocessors from VIA Technologies are fifth- and sixth-generation CPUs targeted at the embedded market.

== Embedded processors ==
=== Eden ESP ===
==== "Samuel 2" (150 nm) ====
- All models support: MMX, 3DNow!

Model number	Frequency	L2-Cache	Front Side Bus	Multiplier	Voltage	TDP	Socket	Release date	Part number(s)
Eden ESP 3000	300 MHz	64 KiB	66 MHz	4.5×	1.05 V	2.5 W	EBGA	December 11, 2001	
Eden ESP 4000	400 MHz	64 KiB	100 MHz	4×	1.05 V	3 W	EBGA	December 11, 2001	
Eden ESP 5000	533 MHz	64 KiB	133 MHz	4×	1.2 V	5 W	EBGA	December 11, 2001	
Eden ESP 6000	600 MHz	64 KiB	133 MHz	4.5×	1.2 V	6 W	EBGA	December 11, 2001	

==== "Nehemiah" (130 nm) ====
- All models support: MMX, SSE, VIA PadLock (AES, RNG)

Model number	Frequency	L2-Cache	Front Side Bus	Multiplier	Voltage	TDP	Socket	Release date	Part number(s)
Eden ESP6000	666 MHz	64 KiB	133 MHz	5×	1.05 V	6 W	EBGA	August 19, 2003	
Eden ESP7000	733 MHz	64 KiB	133 MHz	5.5×	1.05 V	6 W	EBGA	August 19, 2003	
Eden ESP8000	800 MHz	64 KiB	133 MHz	6×	1.05 V	6 W	EBGA	February 10, 2004	
Eden ESP10000	1000 MHz	64 KiB	133 MHz	7.5×	1.05 V	7 W	EBGA	February 10, 2004	
Eden ESP10000	1000 MHz	64 KiB	200 MHz	5×	1.05 V	7 W	EBGA	February 10, 2004	

=== Eden-N ===
==== "Nehemiah" (130 nm) ====
- All models support: MMX, SSE, VIA PadLock (AES, RNG)
- VIA PowerSaver supported

Model number	Frequency	L2-Cache	Front Side Bus	Multiplier	Voltage	TDP	Socket	Release date	Part number(s)
Eden-N 533	533 MHz	64 KiB	133 MHz	4×	0.9 V	2.5/3.5 W	NanoBGA	October 14, 2003	
Eden-N 800	800 MHz	64 KiB	133 MHz	6×	0.95 V	5 W	NanoBGA	October 14, 2003	
Eden-N 1.0 GHz	1000 MHz	64 KiB	133 MHz	7.5×	1 V	7 W	NanoBGA	October 14, 2003	

=== Eden ===
==== "Esther" (standard-voltage, 90 nm) ====
- All models support: MMX, SSE, SSE2, SSE3, NX bit, VIA PadLock (SHA, AES, Montgomery Multiplier, RNG)
- VIA PowerSaver supported with up to 8 ACPI P-states
- Idle power 500 mW

Model number	Frequency	L2-Cache	Front Side Bus	Multiplier	Voltage	TDP	Socket	Release date	Part number(s)
Eden 400	400 MHz	128 KiB	400 MT/s	4×	0.796 V	2.5 W	NanoBGA2	January 17, 2006	
Eden 500	500 MHz	128 KiB	400 MT/s	5×	0.796 V	3.5 W	NanoBGA2	January 17, 2006	
Eden 600	600 MHz	128 KiB	400 MT/s	6×	0.844 V	5 W	NanoBGA2	January 17, 2006	
Eden 800	800 MHz	128 KiB	400 MT/s	8×	0.844 V	5 W	NanoBGA2	January 17, 2006	
Eden 1.0 GHz	1000 MHz	128 KiB	400 MT/s	10×	0.844 V	5 W	NanoBGA2	January 17, 2006	
Eden 1.2 GHz	1200 MHz	128 KiB	400 MT/s	12×	0.860 V - 0.844 V	7 W	NanoBGA2	January 17, 2006	

==== "Esther" (ultra-low-voltage, 90 nm) ====
- All models support: MMX, SSE, SSE2, SSE3, NX bit, VIA PadLock (SHA, AES, Montgomery Multiplier, RNG)
- VIA PowerSaver supported with up to 8 ACPI P-states

Model number	Frequency	L2-Cache	Front Side Bus	Multiplier	Voltage	TDP	Idle Power	Socket	Release date	Part number(s)
Eden ULV 500	500 MHz	128 KiB	400 MT/s	5×	0.684 V	1 W	100 mW	NanoBGA2	August 23, 2007	
Eden ULV 500	500 MHz	128 KiB	400 MT/s	5×	0.6875 V	1 W	mW	MobileBGA		
Eden ULV 1.0 GHz	1000 MHz	128 KiB	400 MT/s	10×	0.796 V	3.5 W	500 mW	NanoBGA2	January 17, 2006	
Eden ULV 1.0 GHz	1000 MHz	128 KiB	400 MT/s	10×	0.8000 V	3.5 W	mW	MobileBGA		
Eden ULV 1.5 GHz	1500 MHz	128 KiB	400 MT/s	15×	0.956 V	7.5 W	500 mW	NanoBGA2	January 17, 2006	
Eden ULV 1.6 GHz	1600 MHz	128 KiB	800 MT/s	7.5×	≤0.988 V	8 W	mW	NanoBGA2		
Eden ULV 1.6 GHz	1600 MHz	128 KiB	800 MT/s	7.5×	≤0.9875 V	8 W	mW	MobileBGA		

=== Eden X2 ===
==== "Eden X2" (40 nm) ====
- All models support: MMX, SSE, SSE2, SSE3, x86-64, NX bit, x86 virtualization, VIA PadLock (SHA, AES, Montgomery Multiplier, RNG)
- VIA Eden X2 U4200 supports SSE4.1

Model number	Frequency	L2-Cache	Front Side Bus	Multiplier	Voltage	TDP	Idle Power	Socket	Cores	Release date	Part number(s)
U4200E	1 GHz	64 KiB+64 KiB	800 MT/s	?×	? V	9 W	? mW	FCBGA	2	March 1, 2011	
U4100E	800 MHz	64 KiB+64 KiB	533 MT/s	?×	? V	5-6 W	? mW	FCBGA	2	March 1, 2011	

=== Eden C ===
==== "Eden C" (28 nm) ====
- All models support: MMX, SSE, SSE2, SSE3, SSSE3, SSE4.1, SSE4.2, AVX, AVX2, x86-64, NX bit, VT-x, VIA PadLock (SHA, AES, RNG), VIA PowerSaver

Announced on 13 August 2015 was a VIA embedded PC using a 1.2 GHz VIA Eden X4 5000-series CPU.

Marketing name	Model number	Clock speed	Turbo speed	L1 cache	L2 cache	FSB speed	TDP	Socket	Cores
Eden X4	C4450	1.6 GHz	2.0 GHz	64 KB / core	2 MB	1333 MHz	10 W	NanoBGA2	4
Eden X4	C4250	1.2 GHz	1.73 GHz	64 KB / core	2 MB	1333 MHz	6 W	NanoBGA2	4
Eden X1	C1050	1.06 GHz	-	64 KB	2 MB	1333 MHz	2 W	NanoBGA2	1

- Article
- Forum Post with Photo
- Forum Post with CPU-Z reporting SSE4.2, AVX & AVX2 support – appears to also report AES-NI

== See also ==
- List of VIA microprocessors
