= LongHaul =

VIA LongHaul is a CPU speed throttling and power saving technology developed by VIA Technologies. By executing specialized instructions, software can exercise fine control on the bus-to-core frequency ratio and CPU core voltage. When the system first boots, the ratio and voltage are set to hardware defaults. While the operating system runs, a CPU driver controls the throttling according to how much load is put on the CPU.

== Processors supporting LongHaul ==
- Cyrix III - some models
- VIA C3
- VIA C7 (PowerSaver)
- VIA Nano (PowerSaver)
