= Zhaoxin =

Chinese semiconductor chip manufacturer

Shanghai Zhaoxin Semiconductor Co., Ltd.
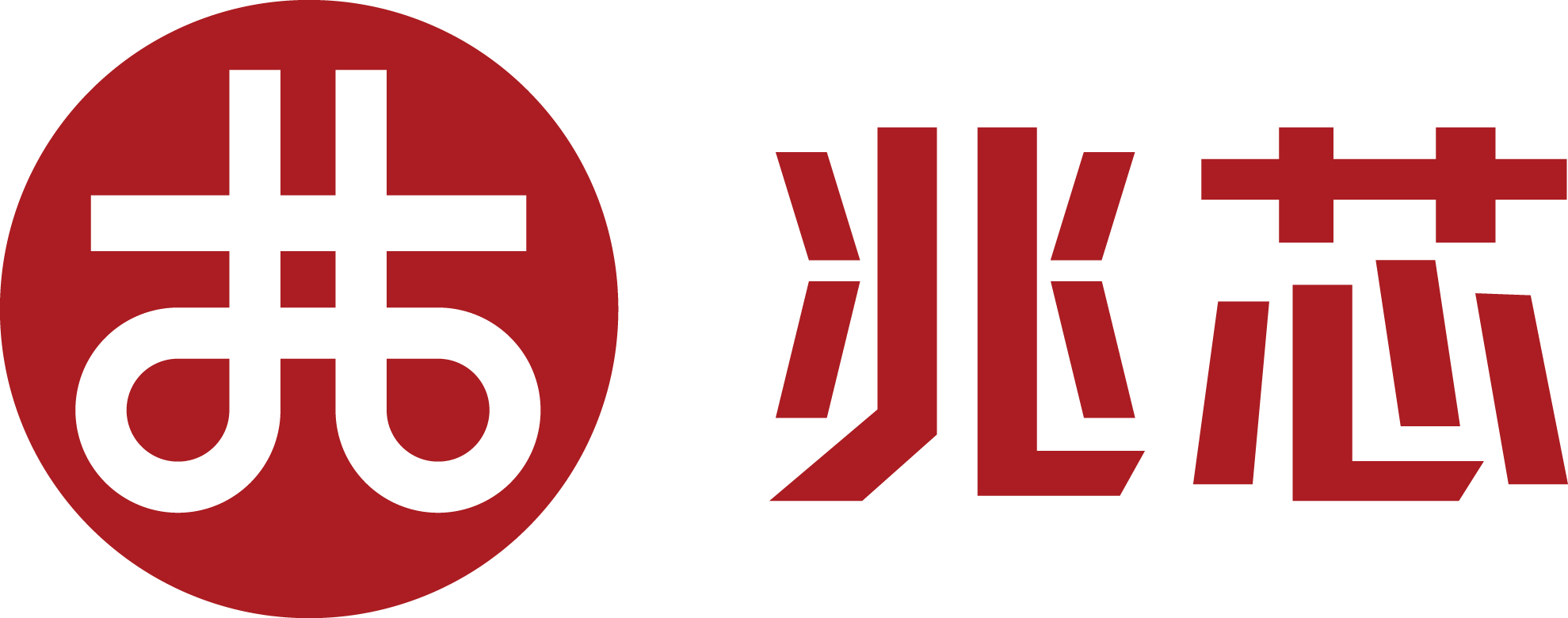
- Zhaoxin's current logo, used since 2013
- Type: Joint venture
- Industry: Semiconductors
- Founded: 2013; 13 years ago
- Headquarters: Shanghai, China
- Area served: China
- Products: Central processing units Microprocessors
- Owner: VIA Technologies; Shanghai Municipal People's Government
- Website: www.zhaoxin.com

Shanghai Zhaoxin Semiconductor Co., Ltd. (/ˈtʃaʊʃɪn/, Chinese: 兆芯; pinyin: Zhàoxīn [ʈʂâu ɕín]) is a fabless semiconductor company, created in 2013 as a joint venture between VIA Technologies and the Shanghai Municipal People's Government. The company manufactures x86-compatible desktop and laptop CPUs. The term Zhào xīn means million core. (Note: In China 兆 can mean either short-scale million (1e6) or trillion (1e12). However, for IT-related topics 兆 always means mega/million in mainland China.) The processors are created mainly for the Chinese market: the venture is an attempt to reduce the Chinese dependence on foreign technology.

== Background ==
Zhaoxin is a joint venture between VIA Technologies and the Shanghai Municipal Government. In 2021 it was reported that VIA has a 14.75% shareholding in the company. China has a domestic policy to "replace all foreign hardware and software from its public infrastructure with homegrown solutions" by 2023 (the so-called 3–5–2 policy). VIA holds an x86 license which allows its subsidiaries to produce compatible microprocessors; this allows Zhaoxin to develop x86 computer chips.

== Architecture ==
The architecture of the initial ZX family of processors is a continuation of VIA's Centaur Technology x86-64 Isaiah design. The ZX-A and ZX-B are based on the VIA Nano X2 C4350AL. The ZX-B is identical to the ZX-A, except that it is manufactured by Shanghai Huali Microelectronics Corporation (HLMC). The ZX-C is based on the VIA QuadCore-E & Eden X4. Zhaoxin calls this architecture "Zhangjiang", however, it is thought that the basis is the VIA Isaiah 2 architecture. Like the VIA processors they were based on, early ZX processors were ball grid array chips sold pre-soldered onto a motherboard.

Zhaoxin came to the attention of the North American and European technology press when, in late 2017 and early 2018, it launched the ZX-D processor and revealed plans for future products. Zhaoxin calls the ZX-D architecture "Wudaokou"; this is a complete re-design of the VIA Isaiah. It is also a departure from earlier microarchitectures, such as ZhangJiang, which were a lightly modified version of a VIA Technologies (Centaur) architecture. WuDaoKou was a new and complete SoC design. Changes implemented in the ZX-D included the integration of a northbridge, like in modern x86 designs, as well as the addition of Chinese cryptographic functions. The ZX-D series also had an integrated graphics processing unit (iGPU) based on S3 Graphics technology (previously owned by VIA).

The former ZX naming was dropped around 2018 in favour of the KX ("KaiXian") designation for desktop processors and the KH ("KaisHeng") designation for server processors.

== Development ==
The successor to the ZX-D, the KX-6000 system on a chip (also called ZX-E), was demonstrated to the press in September 2018. The architecture, an evolution of the ZX-D architecture, was called "Lujiazui". The KX-6000 was formally launched in 2019. In June 2019 the KX-6000 was reported to being built on a 16 nm TSMC process. The chip has a DirectX 11.1 compatible iGPU. In 2022, Zhaoxin was noted to have added ZX-E specific compiler support for the GNU Compiler Collection.

The successor to the KX-6000, the ZX-F or KX-7000 processor series, was initially planned for release in 2021. The KX-7000 chip was reported to be planned for release on a 7 nm process with DDR5 support. An alleged benchmark result for a ZX-F appeared on GeekBench in 2020.

The KX-7000 was finally released in December 2023, two years late. According to test results reported by Tom's Hardware, this processor was twice as fast as the KX-6000 series that came before it. The benchmark score indicated that not only had clock speeds improved substantially, but also instructions-per-clock. In comparison, the KX-7000 was deemed to be on par with similar processors made by AMD or Intel in the mid-to-late 2010s. Zhaoxin was itself reported as saying that the KX-7000 reached the same level of performance as the seventh-generation Intel Core i5-7400 (which was launched in 2017).

In January 2026, Zhaoxin announced the development of the KaiXian KX-8000 microprocessor.

== Discrete GPU ==
In 2020 Zhaoxin announced it was planning to release a dedicated graphics card.

== Summary of architecture ==
Family	μarch codename	SKU	Year introduced	Process	Cores	Frequency	Features	Notes
ZX-A	VIA Isaiah		2014	40 nm	2	1.6 Ghz (up to)	x86-64, SSE4.1, VT-x, PadLock	Based on the VIA Nano X2 C4350AL
ZX-B	VIA Isaiah		2014–2015	40 nm				Identical to ZX-A
ZX-C	Zhangjiang		2015	28 nm	4	2.0 GHz	SSE4.2, AVX, AVX2	Based on the VIA QuadCore-E & Eden X4
ZX-C+	Zhangiang		2016	28 nm	4/8	2.0 GHz	SM3 and SM4 in VIA PadLock; AES-NI	A TDP of 35W
ZX-D	Wudaokou	KX-5000 (consumer); KH-20000 (server)	2017	28 nm	4/8	2.0 GHz	Trusted Execution Technology; dual channel DDR4; PCI Express 3.0; USB 3.1 (Gen 1 and 2); USB 2.0; SATA 3; System-on-a-chip (SoC) with DirectX 11.1	Manufactured by TSMC
ZX-E	Lujiazui	KX-6000 (consumer) / KH-30000 (server)	2019	16 nm	8 (up to)	3 GHz (up to)	DDR4; PCIe 3.0; RDSEED, RDRAND, SHA, UMIP supported; SoC	Manufactured by TSMC
ZX-E	Lujiazui	KX-6000G (consumer)	2022	16 nm	4 (up to)	3.3 GHz (up to)	GPU supports: DX12, OpenCL 1.2, OpenGL 4.6: DDR4; PCIe 3.0; SoC	With Glenfly GT-10C0 integrated GPU
ZX-E	Yongfeng	KH-40000 (server)	2022	16 nm	32 (up to)	2.2 GHz (up to)	DDR4; PCIe 3.0; SoC	
ZX-F	Shijidadao	KX-7000 (consumer)	2023	7 nm	8 (up to)	3.7 GHz (up to)	DDR5; PCIe 4.0; SoC; FMA3	
ZX-F	Shijidadao	KX-7000N (consumer)	2025	7 nm			NPU	
ZX-F	Shijidadao	KH-50000 (server)	2025	7 nm	96 (up to)	3.0 GHz	12x DDR5 ECC; ZPI 5.0; 128x PCIe 5.0; 16x PCIe 4.0; 384 MB cache (all levels)	
		KX-8000	2026 (announced) Full release TBC				(Proposed features) DDR5 PCIe 5.0	
Family	μarch codename	SKU	Year introduced	Process	Cores	Frequency	Features	Notes

== Uses ==
Zhaoxin processors have mainly been used for Chinese laptops.

Outside China, Zhaoxin processors have been used in some NAS appliances, most notably the QNAP TVS-675.

== Performance ==
The Zhaoxin ZX-C+ 4701 CPU was reviewed in 2020, and showed significantly worse performance against older Intel (i5 2500K) and AMD (Athlon 3000G) processors. The ZX-D was noted to have roughly the performance of the Intel Silvermont (Avoton) processors (which were launched in 2013).

The ZX-E / KX-6000 is reported to have a 50% performance increase over the KX-5000, and comparable performance to a 7th generation Intel i5 core processor from 2016 (namely the Core i5-7400). The 8-core ZX-E U6780A was reviewed by Linus Tech Tips in August 2020. The review processor was benchmarked to be slightly slower than a 3rd generation Intel i5 quad-core processor (originally released in 2012–2013) using Cinebench. Gaming performance was noted to be poor, whilst the machine itself was noted to be expensive for its performance by 2020 standards. Tom's Hardware also reviewed the U6780A and reported poor gaming performance in 2020.

The aim for the ZX-F series is for performance parity with the 2018 series Ryzen processors (i.e. the AMD Zen+ microarchitecture, the predecessor to AMD Zen 2).

== See also ==
- Semiconductor industry
- Semiconductor industry in China
- AMD–Chinese joint venture
- Loongson
- FeiTeng
- Sunway (processor)
- Category:Microprocessors made in China
