= List of VIA microprocessor cores =

This article lists x86-compliant microprocessors sold by VIA Technologies, grouped by technical merits: cores within same group have much in common.

== Cyrix design (Cyrix III) ==
- All models support: MMX, 3DNow!

Marketing name	Core	Frequency	Front-side bus	L1-cache	L2-cache	FPU speed	Pipeline stages	Typical power	Voltage	Process
Cyrix III	Joshua	350-450 MHz	100-133 MHz	64 KB	256 KB	100%	?	13-16 W	2.2 V	180 nm Al

== Centaur Technology design ==
=== Cyrix III, C3 ===
- All models support: MMX, 3DNow!

Marketing name	Core	Frequency	Front-side bus	L1 cache	L2 cache	FPU speed	Pipeline stages	Typical power	Voltage	Process
Cyrix III, C3, 1GigaPro	Samuel (C5A)	466-733 MHz	100-133 MHz	128 KB	0 KB	50%	12	6.8-10.6 W	1.8-2.0 V	180 nm Al
Cyrix III, C3, 1GigaPro, Eden ESP, XP 2000+	Samuel 2 (C5B)	600-800 MHz	100-133 MHz	128 KB	64 KB	50%	12	5.8-6.6 W	1.5-1.65 V	150 nm Al
C3, Eden ESP	Ezra (C5C)	733-933 MHz	100-133 MHz	128 KB	64 KB	50%	12	5.3-5.9 W	1.35 V	130 nm Al
C3	Ezra-T (C5N)	800-1000 MHz	100-133 MHz	128 KB	64 KB	50%	12	5.3-11.8 W	1.35-1.45 V	130 nm Al

=== C3, C7 ===
- All models support: MMX, SSE
- SSE2, SSE3, NX bit supported by Esther (C5J)
- x86 (no x86-64)

Marketing name	Core	Frequency	Front-side bus	L1 cache	L2 cache	FPU speed	Pipeline stages	Typical power	Voltage	Process
C3, Eden ESP, Eden-N	Nehemiah (C5XL)	800-1400 MHz	133 MHz	128 KB	64 KB	100%	16	15-19 W	1.25 or 1.4-1.45 V	130 nm Cu
C3	Nehemiah+ (C5P)	1-1.4 GHz	133 MHz	128 KB	64 KB	100%	16	11-12 W	1.25 V	130 nm Cu
C7, C7-D, C7-M, Eden, Eden ULV	Esther (C5J)	0.4-2.0 GHz	400-533 MT/s	128 KB	128 KB	100%	16	12-20 W	0.9-1.1(?) V	90 nm SOI

Series	Model	Core	Frequency [MHz]	Front-side bus [MHz]	Year	Process [nm]	Package size [mm^{2}]	Power [W]	L2 cache [K]	L1 I/D cache [K]	Performance [SPEC2000]
Eden	Eden ESP	Samuel 2	300–600	66/100/133	2001	150	35×35	2.5–6	64	64/64	Unknown
Eden	Eden ESP	Nehemiah	667–1000	133/200	2003–2004	130	35×35	6–7	64	64/64	Unknown
Eden	Eden-N	Nehemiah	533–1000	133	2003	130	15×15	2.5–7	64	64/64	Unknown
Eden	Eden	Esther	400–1500	400–800	2006–2007	90	30	<7.5	128	32/32	Unknown
Eden	Eden X2	Unknown	800	Unknown	2011	40	11×6	Unknown	Unknown	Unknown	Unknown
C3	C3	Samuel 2	667–800	100–133	2001	150	Unknown	13	64	64/64	Unknown
C3	C3	Ezra	800–1000	100–133	2002	130	Unknown	8.3–10	64	64/64	Unknown
C3	C3	Nehemiah	1000–1400	133–200	2003	130	35×35	15–21	64	64/64	Unknown
C3	C3-M	Nehemiah	1000–1400	133–200	2003	130	35×35	11–19	64	64/64	Unknown
C7	C7-D	Esther	1500–1800	400	2006	90	21×21	20–25	128	16/16	Unknown
C7	C7-M	Esther	1000–2000	400	2005	90	21×21	12–20	128	16/16	Unknown
C7	C7	Esther	1500–2000	800	2007	90	21×21	12–20	128	16/16	Unknown

=== Nano ===
- First VIA processor with x86-64 instruction set

Series	Model	Core	Frequency [MHz]	Front-side bus [MHz]	Year	Process [nm]	Package size [mm^{2}]	Power [W]	L2 cache [K]	L1 I/D cache [K]	Performance [SPEC2000]
QuadCore	QuadCore	Isaiah	1000-1460	1066	2011	40	21×21	27.5	4× 1024	4× 64/64	30.1/24.1 rate

- See List of Nano microprocessors

=== CHA ===
- Announced 2019. Discontinued in 2021 with the sales of Centaur to Intel.
- 8 cores + "NCORE" neural processor for AI acceleration.
- supports: MMX SSE SSE2 SSE3 SSSE3 SSE4.1 SSE4.2 AES AVX AVX2 FMA3 SHA AVX512 AVX512F AVX512CD AVX512BW AVX512DQ AVX512VL AVX512IFMA AVX512VBMI.

Marketing name	Code name	Core	Number of cores	Frequency	Microarchitecture	L1 cache	L2 cache	L3 cache	Announced	Expected Release	Process	Socket Type	Pipeline stages	PCIe Lanes
unknown	CHA	CNS	8	2.5 GHz	CNS	32 KiB	256 KiB	16 MB	2019	2H 2020	16 nm	LGA	20-22	44

== See also ==
- List of VIA C3 microprocessors
- List of VIA C7 microprocessors
- List of VIA Eden microprocessors
- List of VIA Nano microprocessors
