= 3DNow! =

Extension to the x86 instruction set by AMD

- Design firm: Advanced Micro Devices
- Introduced: 1998
- Type: instruction set architecture

3DNow! is a deprecated extension to the x86 instruction set developed by Advanced Micro Devices (AMD). It adds single instruction multiple data (SIMD) instructions to the base x86 instruction set, enabling it to perform vector processing of floating-point vector operations using vector registers. This improvement enhances the performance of many graphics-intensive applications. The first microprocessor to implement 3DNow! was the AMD K6-2, introduced in 1998. In appropriate applications, this enhancement raised the speed by about 2–4 times.

3DNow! never gained much popularity, and in 2010 AMD announced its plan to drop support for the instruction set in future processors, with the exception of PREFETCH and PREFETCHW, two instructions that are also supported by Intel's Bay Trail-based processors. The instruction set was eventually dropped since 2017, with the release of Zen-based Ryzen and Epyc processor lines.

== History ==
3DNow! was developed at a time when 3D graphics were becoming mainstream in PC multimedia and games. Realtime display of 3D graphics depended heavily on the host CPU's floating-point unit (FPU) to perform floating-point calculations, a task in which AMD's K6 processor was easily outperformed by its competitor, the Intel Pentium II.

As an enhancement to the MMX instruction set, the 3DNow! instruction-set augmented the MMX SIMD registers to support common arithmetic operations (add/subtract/multiply) on single-precision (32-bit) floating-point data. Software written to use AMD's 3DNow! instead of the slower x87 FPU could execute up to four times faster, depending on the instruction mix.

== Versions ==
=== 3DNow! ===
The first implementation of 3DNow! technology contains 21 new instructions that support SIMD floating-point operations. The 3DNow! data format is packed, single-precision, floating-point. The 3DNow! instruction set also includes operations for SIMD integer operations, data prefetch, and faster MMX-to-floating-point switching. Later, Intel would add similar (but incompatible) instructions to the Pentium III, known as SSE (Streaming SIMD Extensions).

3DNow! floating-point instructions are the following:

- PI2FD – Packed 32-bit integer to floating-point conversion
- PF2ID – Packed floating-point to 32-bit integer conversion
- PFCMPGE – Packed floating-point comparison, greater or equal
- PFCMPGT – Packed floating-point comparison, greater
- PFCMPEQ – Packed floating-point comparison, equal
- PFACC – Packed floating-point accumulate
- PFADD – Packed floating-point addition
- PFSUB – Packed floating-point subtraction
- PFSUBR – Packed floating-point reverse subtraction
- PFMIN – Packed floating-point minimum
- PFMAX – Packed floating-point maximum
- PFMUL – Packed floating-point multiplication
- PFRCP – Packed floating-point reciprocal approximation
- PFRSQRT – Packed floating-point reciprocal square root approximation
- PFRCPIT1 – Packed floating-point reciprocal, first iteration step
- PFRSQIT1 – Packed floating-point reciprocal square root, first iteration step
- PFRCPIT2 – Packed floating-point reciprocal/reciprocal square root, second iteration step

3DNow! integer instructions are the following:

- PAVGUSB – Packed 8-bit unsigned integer averaging
- PMULHRW – Packed 16-bit integer multiply with rounding

3DNow! performance-enhancement instructions are the following:

- FEMMS – Faster entry/exit of the MMX or floating-point state
- PREFETCH/PREFETCHW – Prefetch at least a 32-byte line into L1 data cache (this is the only non-deprecated instruction)

=== 3DNow! extensions ===
There is little or no evidence that the second version of 3DNow! was ever officially given its own trade name. This has led to some confusion in documentation that refers to this new instruction set. The most common terms are Extended 3DNow!, Enhanced 3DNow! and 3DNow!+. The phrase "Enhanced 3DNow!" can be found in a few locations on the AMD website but the capitalization of "Enhanced" appears to be either purely grammatical or used for emphasis on processors that may or may not have these extensions (the most notable of which references a benchmark page for the K6-III-P that does not have these extensions).

This extension to the 3DNow! instruction set was introduced with the first-generation Athlon processors. The Athlon added five new 3DNow! instructions and 19 new MMX instructions. Later, the K6-2+ and K6-III+ (both targeted at the mobile market) included the five new 3DNow! instructions, leaving out the 19 new MMX instructions. The new 3DNow! instructions were added to boost DSP. The new MMX instructions were added to boost streaming media.

The 19 new MMX instructions are a subset of Intel's SSE instruction set. In AMD technical manuals, AMD segregates these instructions apart from the 3DNow! extensions. In AMD customer product literature, however, this segregation is less clear where the benefits of all 24 new instructions are credited to enhanced 3DNow! technology. This has led programmers to come up with their own name for the 19 new MMX instructions. The most common appears to be Integer SSE (ISSE). SSEMMX and MMX2 are also found in video filter documentation from the public domain sector. ISSE could also refer to Internet SSE, an early name for SSE.

3DNow! extension DSP instructions are the following:

- PF2IW – Packed floating-point to integer word conversion with sign extend
- PI2FW – Packed integer word to floating-point conversion
- PFNACC – Packed floating-point negative accumulate
- PFPNACC – Packed floating-point mixed positive-negative accumulate
- PSWAPD – Packed swap doubleword

MMX extension instructions (Integer SSE) are the following:

- MASKMOVQ – Streaming (cache bypass) store using byte mask
- MOVNTQ – Streaming (cache bypass) store
- PAVGB – Packed average of unsigned byte
- PAVGW – Packed average of unsigned word
- PMAXSW – Packed maximum signed word
- PMAXUB – Packed maximum unsigned byte
- PMINSW – Packed minimum signed word
- PMINUB – Packed minimum unsigned byte
- PMULHUW – Packed multiply high unsigned word
- PSADBW – Packed sum of absolute byte differences
- PSHUFW – Packed shuffle word
- PEXTRW – Extract word into integer register
- PINSRW – Insert word from integer register
- PMOVMSKB – Move byte mask to integer register
- PREFETCHNTA – Prefetch using the NTA reference
- PREFETCHT0 – Prefetch using the T0 reference
- PREFETCHT1 – Prefetch using the T1 reference
- PREFETCHT2 – Prefetch using the T2 reference
- SFENCE – Store fence

=== 3DNow! Professional ===
3DNow! Professional is a trade name used to indicate processors that combine 3DNow! technology with a complete SSE instructions set (such as SSE, SSE2 or SSE3). The Athlon XP was the first processor to carry the 3DNow! Professional trade name, and was the first product in the Athlon family to support the complete SSE instruction set (for the total of: 21 original 3DNow! instructions; five 3DNow! extension DSP instructions; 19 MMX extension instructions; and 52 additional SSE instructions for complete SSE compatibility).

=== 3DNow! and the Geode GX/LX ===
The Geode GX and Geode LX added two new 3DNow! instructions which is absent in all other processors.

3DNow! "professional" instructions unique to the Geode GX/LX are the following:

- PFRSQRTV – Reciprocal square root approximation for a pair of 32-bit floats
- PFRCPV – Reciprocal approximation for a pair of 32-bit floats

== Advantages and disadvantages ==
One advantage of 3DNow! is that it is possible to add or multiply the two numbers that are stored in the same register. With SSE, each number can only be combined with a number in the same position in another register. This capability, known as horizontal in Intel terminology, was the major addition to the SSE3 instruction set.

A disadvantage with 3DNow! is that 3DNow! instructions and MMX instructions share the same register-file, whereas SSE adds 8 new independent registers (XMM0–XMM7).

Because MMX/3DNow! registers are shared by the standard x87 FPU, 3DNow! instructions and x87 instructions cannot be executed simultaneously. However, because it is aliased to the x87 FPU, the 3DNow! and MMX register states can be saved and restored by the traditional x87 F(N)SAVE and F(N)RSTOR instructions. This arrangement allowed operating systems to support 3DNow! with no explicit modifications, whereas SSE registers required explicit operating system support to properly save and restore the new XMM registers (via the added FXSAVE and FXRSTOR instructions.)

The FX* instructions from SSE provide a functional superset of the older x87 save and restore instructions. They can save not only SSE register states but also the x87 register states (hence are applicable also for MMX and 3DNow! operations where supported).

On AMD Athlon XP and K8-based cores (i.e. Athlon 64), assembly programmers have noted that it is possible to combine 3DNow! and SSE instructions to reduce register pressure, but in practice it is difficult to improve performance due to the instructions executing on shared functional units.

== Processors supporting 3DNow! ==
- All AMD processors after K6-2 (based on K6), Athlon, Athlon 64 and Phenom architecture families.
  - Not supported in Bulldozer, Bobcat and Zen architecture processors and their derivates.
  - The last AMD APU processor supporting 3DNow! is the A8-3870K, which is based on the Llano architecture. It is also the only APU with 3DNow! instructions, as the Bobcat and up exclude support for it.
- National Semiconductor Geode GX2, later AMD Geode.
- VIA C3 (also known as Cyrix III) "Samuel", "Samuel 2", "Ezra", and "Eden ESP" cores.
- IDT WinChip 2, 3
