= VIA Technologies =

Taiwanese chipsets manufacturer

VIA Technologies, Inc.
- Native name: 威盛電子
- Romanized name: Wēishèng diànzǐ
- Type: Public
- Traded as: TWSE: 2388
- Industry: Computer Hardware; Custom Embedded Electronics
- Founded: 1987; 39 years ago in Fremont, California, United States
- Headquarters: New Taipei City, Taiwan
- Products: Chipsets, motherboards, CPUs
- Revenue
- Number of employees: 2,000
- Website: ViaTech.com

VIA Technologies, Inc. (Chinese: 威盛電子; pinyin: Wēishèng Diànzǐ) is a Taiwanese manufacturer of integrated circuits, mainly motherboard chipsets, CPUs, and memory. It was once the world's largest independent manufacturer of motherboard chipsets. As a fabless semiconductor company, VIA conducts research and development of its chipsets in-house, then subcontracts the actual (silicon) manufacturing to third-party merchant foundries such as TSMC.

VIA is also the parent company of VIA Labs Inc. (VLI, Chinese: 威鋒電子). As an independently traded subsidiary, VLI develops and markets USB3, USB4, USB Type-C, and USB PD controllers for computer peripherals and mobile devices.

== History ==
The company was founded in 1987, in Fremont, California, USA by Cher Wang. In 1992, it was decided to move the headquarters to Taipei, Taiwan in order to establish closer partnerships with the substantial and growing IT manufacturing base in Taiwan and neighbouring China.

In 1999, VIA acquired most of Cyrix, then a division of National Semiconductor. That same year, VIA acquired Centaur Technology from Integrated Device Technology, marking its entry into the x86 microprocessor market. VIA is the maker of the VIA C3, VIA C7 & VIA Nano processors, and the EPIA platform. The Cyrix MediaGX platform remained with National Semiconductor.

In 2001, VIA established the S3 Graphics joint venture.

In January 2005, VIA began the VIA pc-1 Initiative, to develop information and communication technology systems to benefit those with no access to computers or Internet. In February 2005, VIA celebrated production of the 100 millionth VIA AMD chipset.

In July 2008, VIA Labs, Inc. (VLI) was founded as a wholly owned subsidiary of VIA Technologies Inc. (VIA) to develop and market integrated circuits primarily for USB 3.0. VLI was intended to be a "smaller and thus more agile" company that can quickly respond to the changing market. It later became an independently traded subsidiary in 2020.

In August 2008, the company announced that it was leaving the third-party support chipset business for Intel and AMD CPUs to concentrate on its own x86 processors and integrated motherboards. It cited the fact that the third-party chipset market had effectively disappeared and that VIA would require the capability to provide its own platform.

On 29 August 2008, VIA announced that it would release official 2D accelerated Linux drivers for its chipsets, and would also release 3D accelerated drivers.

In 2013, VIA entered into an agreement with the Shanghai Municipal Government to create a fabless semiconductor company called Zhaoxin. The joint venture is producing x86-compatible CPUs for the Chinese market.

In November 2021, Intel recruited some of the employees of the Centaur Technology division from VIA, a deal worth $125 million, and effectively acquiring the talent and know-how of the x86 division. VIA retained the x86 licence and associated patents, and its Zhaoxin CPU joint venture continues.

== Products ==
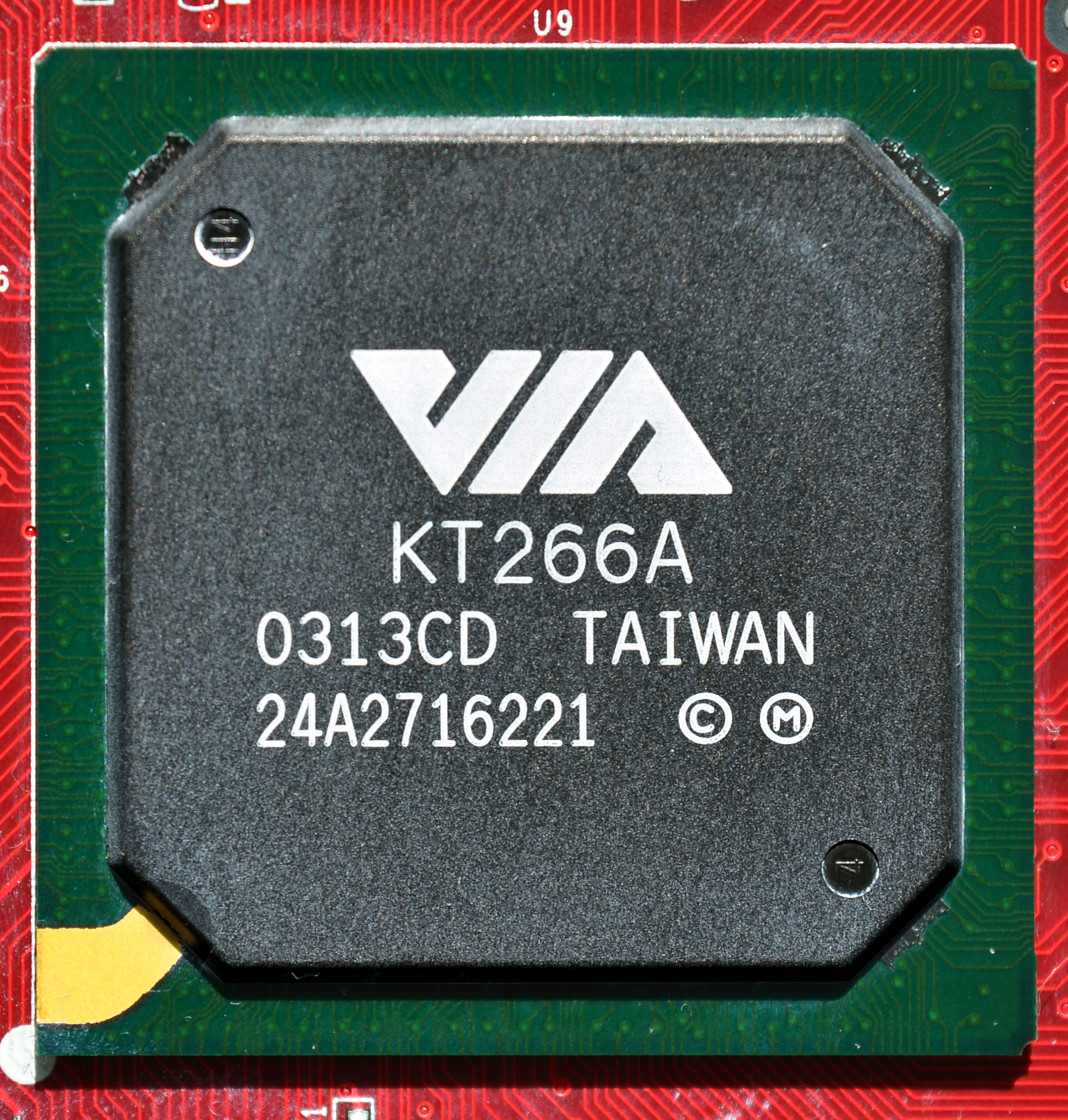
VIA KT266A north bridge for Socket A

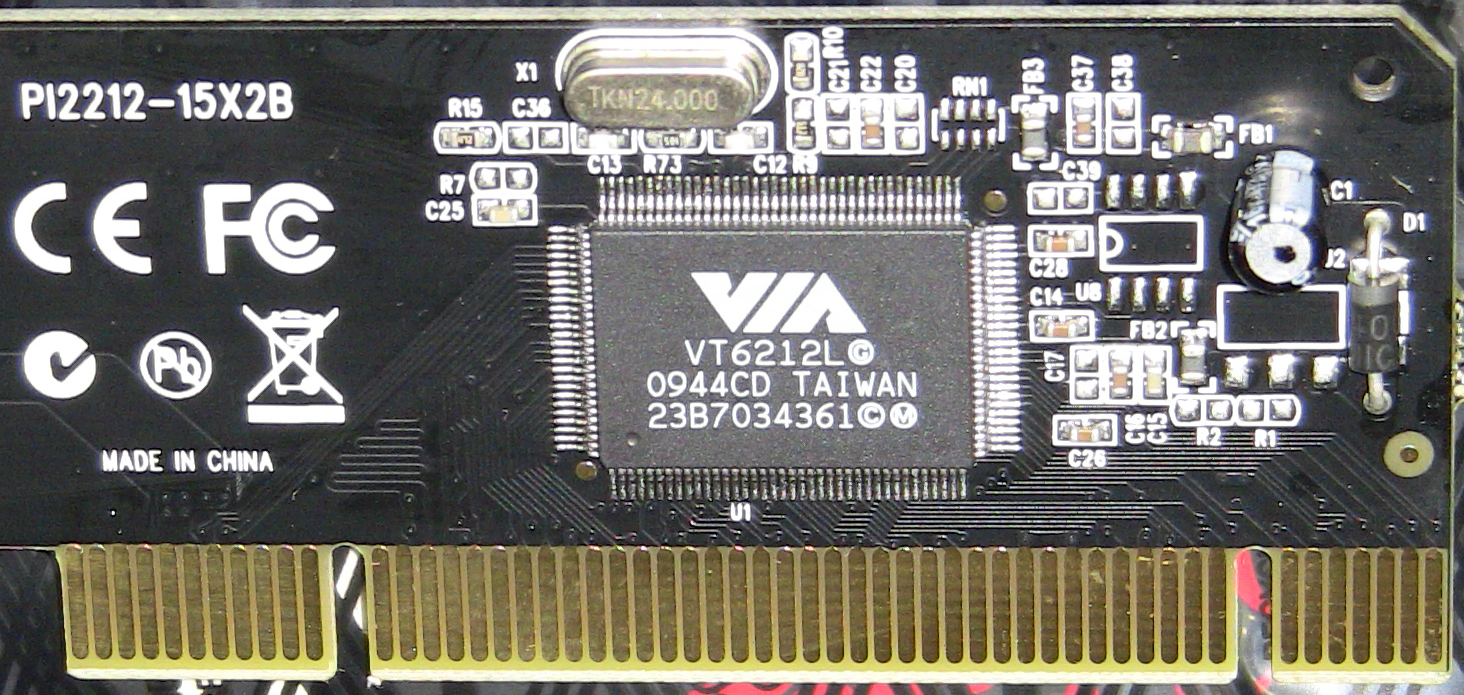
A VIA USB PHY on a Rosewill-branded PCI USB 2.0 desktop expansion card

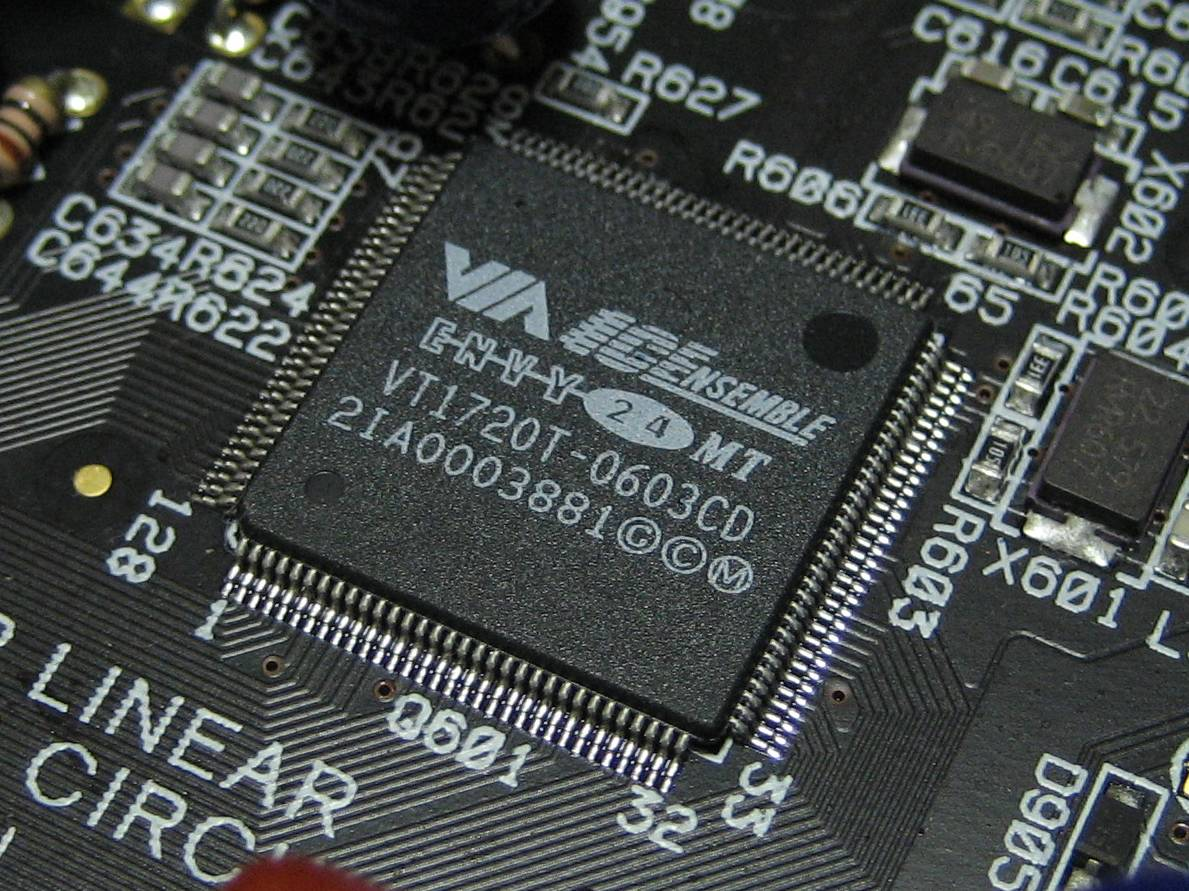
VIA Vinyl Audio Envy24MT chip of a PCI sound card

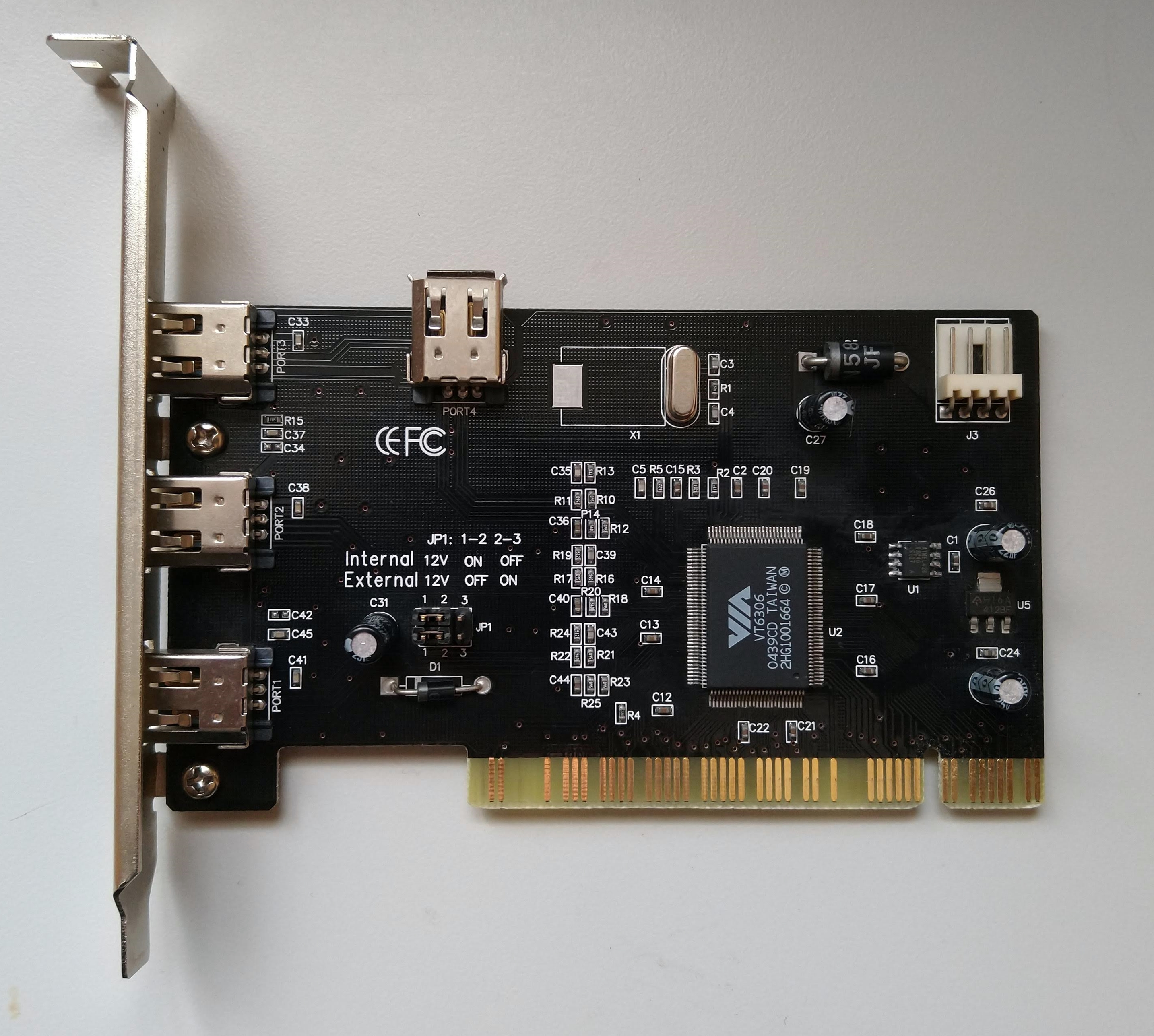
An IEEE 1394 FireWire-400 PCI card with the VIA VT6306 chipset

By the mid-1990s, VIA's business focused on integrated chipsets for the PC market. Among PC users then, VIA was best known for its motherboard (core-logic) chipsets. However, VIA's products include audio controllers, network/connectivity controllers, low-power CPUs, and even CD/DVD-writer chipsets. PC and peripheral vendors such as ASUS then bought the chipsets for inclusion into its own product brands.

In the late 1990s, VIA began diversifying its core-logic business, and the company made business acquisitions forming a CPU division, graphics division, and a sound division. As advances in silicon manufacturing continue to increase the level of integration and functionality in chipsets, VIA acquired these divisions at the time to remain competitive in the core-logic market.

VIA has produced multiple x86 compatible CPUs, through its acquisitions of Cyrix and Centaur Technology. VIA produces CPUs through the Zhaoxin joint venture. Many of the CPUs are BGA chips sold pre-soldered onto a motherboard. Some of the VIA x86 processors also contain an undocumented Alternate Instruction Set.

== Market trends ==
By 1996, VIA established itself as an important supplier of PC components with its chipsets for Socket 7 platform. With the Apollo VP3 chipset in 1997 VIA pioneered AGP support for Socket 7 processors. VIA's market position between 1998 and 2000 derived from the success of its Pentium III chipsets. Around 2001 Intel discontinued the development of its SDRAM chipsets, and stated as policy that only RDRAM memory would be supported going forward. Since RDRAM was more expensive and offered few, if any, obvious performance advantages, manufacturers found they could ship performance-equivalent PCs at a lower cost by using VIA chipsets.

In response to increasing market competition, VIA acquired the ailing S3 Graphics business in 2001. While the S3 Savage chipset was not fast enough to survive as a discrete graphics product, its low manufacturing cost made it an ideal for integration with the VIA northbridge. At the time under VIA, the S3 brand generally held about 10% share of the PC graphics market, behind Intel and Nvidia. VIA also included the VIA Envy soundcard on its motherboards, which offered 24-bit sound. While its Pentium 4 chipset designs struggled to win market share in the face of legal threats from Intel, the K8T800 chipset for the Athlon 64 was popular.

In 2008, VIA left the support chipset business for Intel and AMD CPUs, claiming that the market for third party chipsets had all but disappeared and that it needed to concentrate on its own platform.

From 2004 to 2012, VIA continued the development of its VIA C3 and VIA C7 as well as other x86 and x86-64 compatible processors, targeting small, light, low power applications. For example, in January 2008, VIA unveiled the VIA Nano, an 11 mm × 11 mm footprint VM-enabled x86-64 processor, which debuted in May 2008, for ultra-mobile PCs. By 2013 with its Zhaoxin joint-venture, VIA continued to create x86-64 compatible CPU designs derived from their 1999 purchase of Centaur Technologies and integrated-graphics systems, owing to VIA's earlier relationship and eventual 2001 purchase of S3 Graphics.

== Legal issues ==
On the basis of the Integrated Device Technology Centaur Technology acquisition, VIA appeared to have come into possession of at least three patents, which covered key aspects of processor technology used by Intel. On the basis of the negotiating leverage these patents offered, in 2003, VIA arrived at an agreement with Intel that allowed for a ten-year patent cross license, enabling VIA to continue to design and manufacture x86 compatible CPUs. VIA was also granted a three-year grace period in which it could continue to use Intel socket infrastructure.

== See also ==
- List of companies of Taiwan
- List of VIA chipsets
- List of VIA microprocessor cores
- Mini-ITX
- MoMA Eve
- Nano-ITX
- NanoBook
- Pico-ITX
