= HPE BladeSystem =

Line of blade server machines by Hewlett Packard Enterprise

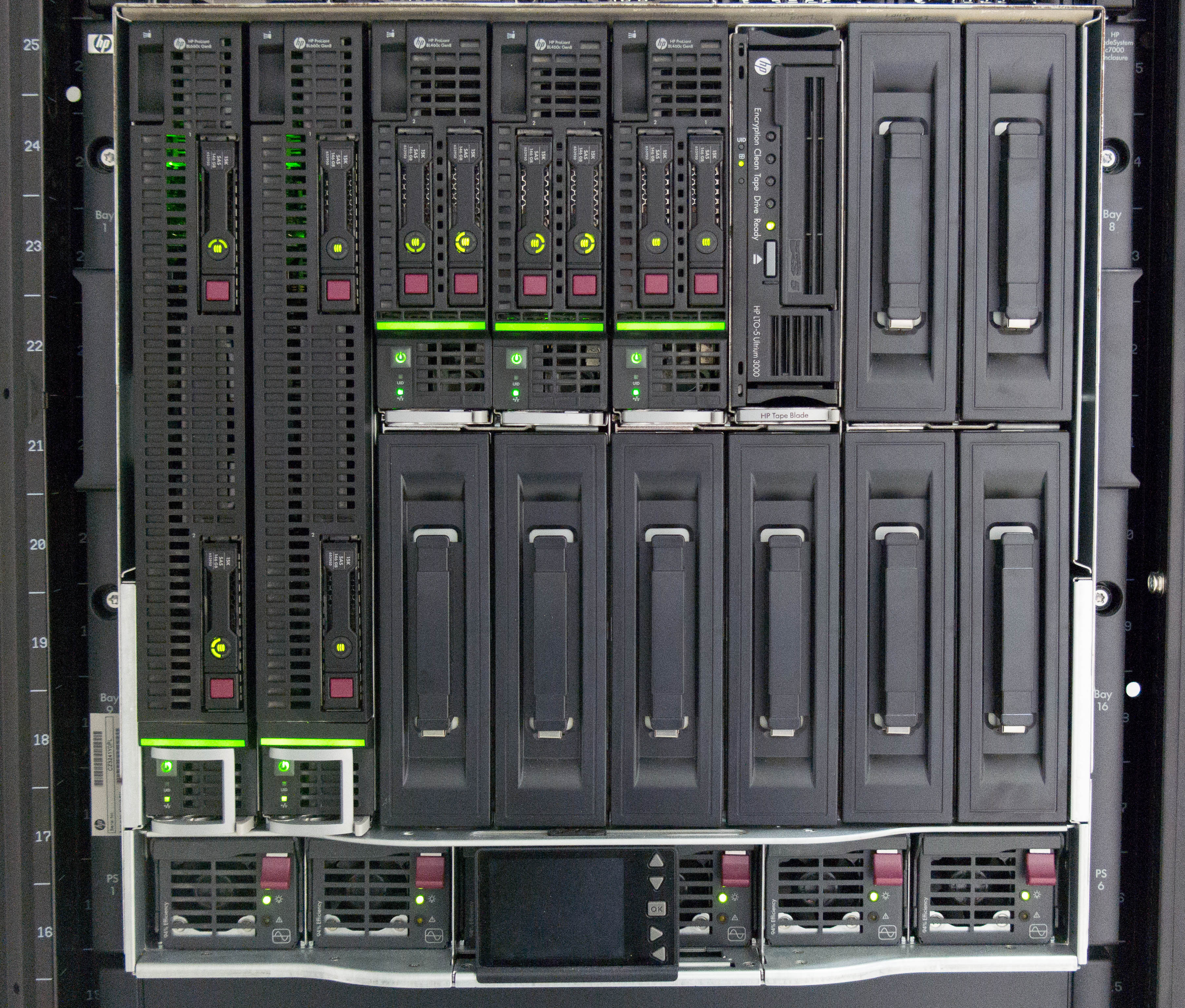
- HPE c7000 enclosure
- Also known as: HP BladeSystem
- Developer: Hewlett Packard Enterprise
- Type: Blade server
- Released: 2006
- CPU: x86
- Predecessor: RLX ServerBlade

BladeSystem is a line of blade server machines from Hewlett Packard Enterprise (Formerly Hewlett-Packard) that was introduced in June 2006.

The BladeSystem forms part of the HP ConvergedSystem platform, which use a common converged infrastructure architecture for server, storage, and networking products. Designed for enterprise installations of 100 to more than 1,000 Virtual machines, the HP ConvergedSystem 700 is configured with BladeSystem servers. When managing a software-defined data center, a System administrator can perform automated lifecycle management for BladeSystems using HPE OneView for converged infrastructure management.

The BladeSystem allows users to build a high-density system, up to 128 servers in each rack.

== Components ==
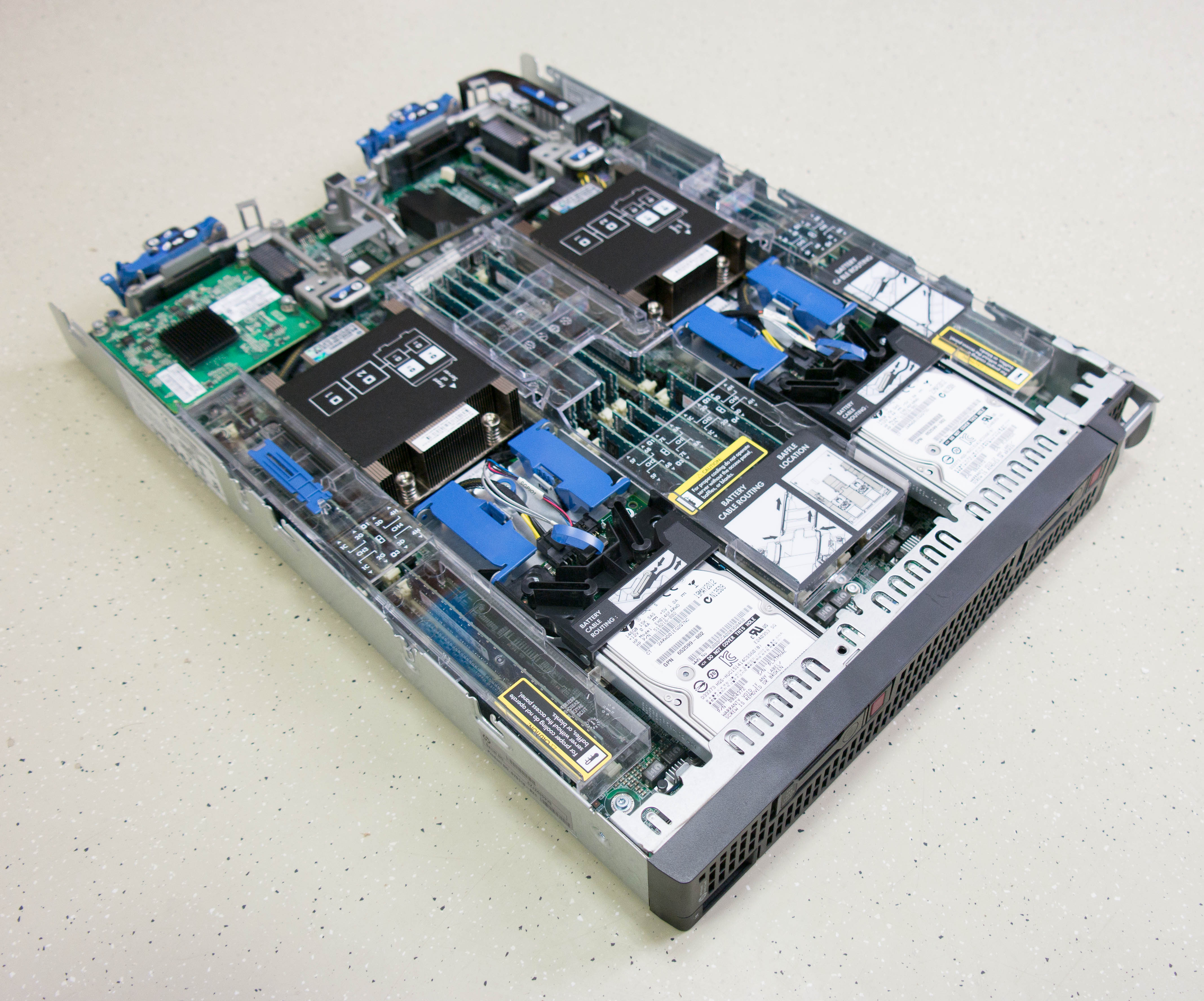
HPE ProLiant BL660 Gen8 server blade

=== Enclosures ===
HPE currently offers 2 types of enclosures in its c-Class BladeSystem lineup succeeding the p-Class BladeSystem

==== c7000 ====
The BladeSystem c7000 enclosure has had multiple versions, the first version of which was announced in June 2006. In 2007 there was a minor update to the first version that included a larger Onboard Administrator display (3 inches, up from 2 inches). The next update (second version) was in 2009 and brought RoHS compatibility, increased backplane speed (5 Tbit/s, up from 4 Tbit/s), 1 Gbit/s Onboard Administrator connectivity, and increased blade connectivity options like: 2x 10 Gbit/s Ethernet support, 4x QDR or 1x FDR InfiniBand port support, and 6 Gbit/s SAS. The third version of the c7000 enclosure, called the c7000 Platinum Enclosure was released in February 2013. It features location discovery services, thermal discovery services and redesigned backplane. The new backplane increased aggregate bandwidth 40% from 5 to 7 Tbit/s to allow use newest high-speed interconnect modules (such as 16 Gbit/s FC and multiple ports of 56 Gbit/s FDR InfiniBand). Also the new Platinum Plus rating power supplies were announced with higher efficiency than previous Gold Plus rating power supplies.

All versions of the enclosure occupy 10 rack units and can accommodate up to 16 half-height blade servers. It includes space for 6 power supplies (single-phase, three-phase or a −48V DC), 10 cooling fans, 8 single-wide (such as 1/10 Gbit/s Ethernet or 8/16 Gbit/s FC) or 4 double-wide (such as 40 Gbit/s Ethernet or Infiniband) interconnect modules (that allows for up to 4 redundant interconnect fabrics)

==== c3000 ====
The HPE c3000 enclosure was announced in August 2007. Updated version of the enclosure called c3000 Platinum was announced in February 2013.

All versions of the enclosure occupy 6 rack units or can be used as a standalone unit (with optional tower conversion kit) It can accommodate up to 8 half-height blade servers. It includes space for 6 power supplies (single-phase, or a -48V DC), 6 cooling fans, 4 single-wide or 2 single-wide and one double-wide interconnect modules

==== p-Class ====
Taking up 6 rack units, the p-Class enclosure can house 16 Half height, 8 Full-height or 2 Quad-wide p blades. There are two interconnect modules on the front allowing for different connectivity options such as Fibre channel. Power is managed by a Powerenclosure; 1u 6x PSU single-phase or 6x PSU three-phase / 48v DC 3u enclosures. The two types of backplanes determine what blades are supported; the standard backplane supports BL20p and BL25p blades whereas the enhanced backplane supports BL20p, BL25p, BL30p, BL35p, BL40p, BL45p, and BL60p (All generations).

=== Server blades ===
HPE has offered general-purpose Proliant server blades (based on Intel Xeon and AMD Opteron CPUs) as well as Integrity (based on the Intel Itanium CPU) and specialized ProLiant blades aimed at workstation virtualization. Blades can use half-height/full-height and single-wide/double-wide/quad-wide form factors. Apart from built-in 1 Gbit/s Ethernet network adapters, optional mezzanine cards can be installed on the blades to further increase connectivity options. These can include more network adapters, HBA/RAID Cards, SAN Fibre Channel Cards, and GPUs up to Nvidia Quadro FX 2800M via the (WS460c). WS ProLiant Blades can have a half-height GPU Blade that can be installed to accommodate full-height double graphics cards

Blade Models
| Model | Form Factor | Year | Chipset | CPU (No. & Socket) | CPU (Type) | RAM (Max) | RAM (Type) | Drive Bays |
|---|---|---|---|---|---|---|---|---|
| BL260c G5 | Half-Height | 2007 | Intel 5100 | 2 LGA 771 | Intel Clovertown 5200, 5300, 5400 | 6x DIMMs, 48 GB | DDR2, 667 | 2x Non-Hot plug SATA |
| BL460c G5 | Half-Height | 2007 | Intel 5100 | 2 LGA 771 | Intel Clovertown 5200, 5300, 5400 | 8x DIMMs, 64 GB | DDR2, 667 | 2x SFF SAS/SATA E200i |
| BL465c G5 | Half-Height | 2007 | ServerWorks HT-1000 and HT-2100 | 2 Socket F | AMD Opteron 2300 | 8x DIMMs, 64 GB (667), 32 GB (800) | DDR2, 800 | 2x SFF SAS/SATA E200i |
| BL480c G5 | Full-Height | 2007 | Intel 5000P | 2 LGA 771 | Intel Clovertown 5200, 5300, 5400 | 12x DIMMs, 64 GB | DDR2, 667 | 4x SFF SAS/SATA P400i |
| BL680c G5 | Full-Height | 2007 | Intel 7300 | 4 Socket 604 | Intel Dunnington | 16x DIMMs, 128 GB | DDR2, 667 | 2x SFF SAS/SATA P400i |
| BL685c G5 | Full-Height | 2007 | nVidia CK8-04, IO-04 | 4 Socket F | AMD Opteron 8200, 8300 | 4x DIMMs Per processor, 128 GB | DDR2, 667 | 2x SFF SAS/SATA P400i |
| BL860c | Full-Height | 2007 | HP ZX2 | 2 MPGA 700 | Intel Itanium 2 9000, 9100 | 12x DIMMs, 48 GB | DDR2, 533 | 2x SFF SAS/SATA LSI 1068 |
| BL870c | Double Full-Height | 2007 | HP ZX2 | 4 MPGA 700 | Intel Itanium 2 9000, 9100 | 24x DIMMs, 192 GB | DDR2, 533 | 4x SFF SAS/SATA LSI 1068 |
| BL2x220c G6 | 2 Node Half-Height | 2009 | Intel 5500 | 2x 2 LGA 1366 | Intel Nehalem 5500 | 3x DIMMs Per Processor, 96 GB | DDR3, 1333 | 1x Non-Hot plug SATA |
| BL280c G6 | Half-Height | 2009 | Intel 5500 | 2 LGA 1366 | Intel Nehalem 5500 | 6x DIMMs Per Processor, 192 GB | DDR3, 1333 | 2x Non-Hot plug SATA SSD |
| BL460c G6 | Half-Height | 2009 | Intel 5500 | 2 LGA 1366 | Intel Nehalem 5500 | 6x DIMMs Per Processor, 192 GB | DDR3, 1333 | 2x SFF SAS/SATA P410i |
| WS460c | Half-Height | 2009 | Intel 5500 | 2 LGA 1366 | Intel Nehalem 5500 | 6x DIMMs Per Processor, 192 GB | DDR3, 1333 | 2x SFF SAS/SATA P410i |
| BL465 G6 | Half-Height | 2009 | ServerWorks HT-2100, HT-1000 | 2 Socket F | AMD Opteron 2400 | 4x DIMMs Per Processor, 64 GB (667), 32 GB (800) | DDR2, 800 | 2x SFF SAS/SATA E200i |
| BL490c G6 | Half-Height | 2009 | Intel 5500 | 2 LGA 1366 | Intel Nehalem 5500 | 9x DIMMs Per Processor, 192 GB | DDR3, 1333 | 2x Non-Hot plug SATA SSD |
| BL495c G6 | Half-Height | 2009 | ServerWorks HT-2100, HT-1000 | 2 Socket F | AMD Opteron 2400 | 8x DIMMs Per Processor, 128 GB | DDR2, 800 | 2x Non-Hot plug SATA SSD |
| BL685c G6 | Full-Height | 2009 | ServerWorks HT-2100, HT-1000 | 4 Socket G34 | AMD Opteron 8200, 8300, 8400 | 8x DIMMs Per Processor, 256 GB (533), 128 GB (800) | DDR2, 800 | 2x SFF SAS/SATA P400i |
| BL2x220c G7 | 2 Node Half-Height | 2010 | Intel 5520 | 2x 2 LGA 1366 | Intel Westmere 5600 | 3x DIMMs Per Processor, 96 GB | DDR3, 1333 | 1x Non-Hot plug SATA |
| BL460c G7 | Half-Height | 2010 | Intel 5520 | 2 LGA 1366 | Intel Westmere 5600 | 6x DIMMs Per Processor, 384 GB | DDR3, 1333 | 2x SFF SAS/SATA P410i |
| BL 465c G7 | Full-Height | 2010 | AMD SR5690 and SP5100 | 2 Socket G34 | AMD Opteron 6200, 6300 | 8x DIMMs Per Processor, 512 GB | DDR3, 1333 | 2x SFF SAS/SATA P410i |
| BL490c G7 | Half-Height | 2010 | Intel 5520 | 2 LGA 1366 | Intel Westmere 5600 | 9x DIMMs Per Processor, 384 GB | DDR3, 1333 | 2x Non-Hot plug SATA SSD |
| BL620c G7 | Full-Height | 2010 | Intel 7500 | 2 LGA 1567 | Westmere EX 2800 | 16x DIMMs Per Processor, 1 TB | DDR3, 1333 | 2x SFF SAS/SATA P410i |
| BL680c G7 | Double Full-Height | 2010 | Intel 7500 | 4 LGA 1567 | Westmere EX 4800, 8800 | 16x DIMMs Per Processor, 2 TB | DDR3, 1333 | 4x SFF SAS/SATA P410i |
| BL685 G7 | Full-Height | 2010 | AMD SR5690 and SP5100 | 4 Socket G34 | AMD Opteron 6100, 6200, 6300 | 8x DIMMs Per Processor, 1 TB | DDR3, 1066 | 2x SFF SAS/SATA P410i |
| BL860c i2 | Full-Height | 2011 | Intel 7500 | 2 LGA 1248 | Intel Itanium 2 9300 | 24x DIMMs, 384 GB | DDR3, 1600 | 2x SFF SAS/SATA P410i |
| BL870c i2 | Double Full-Height | 2011 | Intel 7500 | 4 LGA 1248 | Intel Itanium 2 9300 | 48x DIMMs, 768 GB | DDR3, 1600 | 4x SFF SAS/SATA P410i |
| BL890c i2 | Quad Full-Height | 2011 | Intel 7500 | 8 LGA 1248 | Intel Itanium 2 9300 | 96x DIMMs, 1.5 TB | DDR3, 1600 | 8x SFF SAS/SATA P410i |
| BL860c i4 | Full-Height | 2011 | Intel 7500 | 2 LGA 1248 | Intel Itanium 2 9500 | 24x DIMMs, 384 GB | DDR3, 1600 | 2x SFF SAS/SATA P410i |
| BL870c i4 | Double Full-Height | 2011 | Intel 7500 | 4 LGA 1248 | Intel Itanium 2 9500 | 48x DIMMs, 768 GB | DDR3, 1600 | 4x SFF SAS/SATA P410i |
| BL890c i4 | Quad Full-Height | 2011 | Intel 7500 | 8 LGA 1248 | Intel Itanium 2 9500 | 96x DIMMs, 1.5 TB | DDR3, 1600 | 8x SFF SAS/SATA P410i |
| BL860c i6 | Full-Height | 2011 | Intel 7500 | 2 LGA 1248 | Intel Itanium 2 9700 | 24x DIMMs, 384 GB | DDR3, 1600 | 2x SFF SAS/SATA P410i |
| BL870c i6 | Double Full-Height | 2011 | Intel 7500 | 4 LGA 1248 | Intel Itanium 2 9700 | 48x DIMMs, 768 GB | DDR3, 1600 | 4x SFF SAS/SATA P410i |
| BL890c i6 | Quad Full-Height | 2011 | Intel 7500 | 8 LGA 1248 | Intel Itanium 2 9700 | 96x DIMMs, 1.5 TB | DDR3, 1600 | 8x SFF SAS/SATA P410i |
| BL420c Gen8 | Half-Height | 2011 | Intel 7500 | 2 LGA 1356 | Intel Sandy Bridge EN 2400 | 6x DIMMs Per Processor, 192 GB | DDR3, 1333 | 2x SFF SAS/SATA P220i/B320i |
| WS460c Gen8 | Half-Height | 2011 | Intel C600 | 2 LGA 2011 (R1) | Intel Sandy Bridge EP 2600 | 8x DIMMs Per Processor, LRDIMMs 1333 512 GB, RDIMMs 1866 256 GB | DDR3, 1866 | 2x SFF SAS/SATA P220i |
| BL460c Gen8 | Half-Height | 2011 | Intel C600 | 2 LGA 2011 (R1) | Intel Sandy Bridge EP 2600 | 8x DIMMs Per Processor, LRDIMMs 1333 512 GB, RDIMMs 1600 256 GB | DDR3, 1600 | 2x SFF SAS/SATA P220i |
| BL465c Gen8 | Half-Height | 2011 | AMD SR5690 and SP5100 | 2 Socket G34 | AMD Opteron 6300 | 8x DIMMs Per Processor, LRDIMMs 1333 512 GB, RDIMMs 1600 256 GB | DDR3, 1600 | 2x SFF SAS/SATA P220i |
| BL660c Gen8 | Full-Height | 2011 | Intel C600 | 4 Socket 2011-1 | Intel Sandy Bridge EP, Ivy Bridge EX | 8x DIMMs Per Processor, LRDIMMs 1 TB | DDR3, 1866 | 2x SFF SAS/SATA P220i |
| BL460c Gen9 | Half-Height | 2013 | Intel C610 | 2 LGA 2011-v3 (R3) | Intel Haswell-EP 2600 | 8x DIMMs Per Processor, LRDIMMs 2 TB | DDR4, 2400 | 2x SFF SAS/SATA P244br/B140i |
| WS460c Gen9 | Half-Height | 2013 | Intel C610 | 2 LGA 2011-v3 (R3) | Intel Haswell-EP 2600 | 8x DIMMs Per Processor, LRDIMMs 1 TB | DDR4, 2400 | 2x SFF SAS/SATA P244br/B140i |
| BL660c Gen9 | Full-Height | 2013 | Intel C610 | 4 LGA 2011-v3 (R3) | Intel Haswell-EP 4600 | 8x DIMMs Per Processor, LRDIMMs 4 TB | DDR4, 2400 | 4x SFF SAS/SATA P246br/B140i |
| BL460c Gen10 | Half-Height | 2017 | Intel C621 | 2 LGA 3647 | Intel Skylake-SP | 8x DIMMs Per Processor, LRDIMMs 2 TB | DDR4, 2933 | 2x SFF NVMe P204i-b/S100i SR |

=== Networking ===
Several connectivity options are available for the HPE BladeSystem:

- HPE Virtual Connect modules
- HPE Aruba networking switches
- Cisco Ethernet and Fibre Channel switches and fabric extenders
- Broadcom Fibre Channel switches and pass-through modules
- Mellanox Infiniband

=== Storage ===
Storage options include:

- Internal server HDDs (usually 2 to 4 with hot-swap capabilities)
- Internal USB, SD or microSD slot
- Connecting to external SAN via FC, SAS or iSCSI; enabled by the use of a mezzanine I/O card
- Storage blade (with large number of internal HDD's)
- Tape blade (half-height blade unit hosting LTO tape drive and designed to connect to adjacent blade server)
