= Socket C32 =

CPU socket for AMD server CPUs

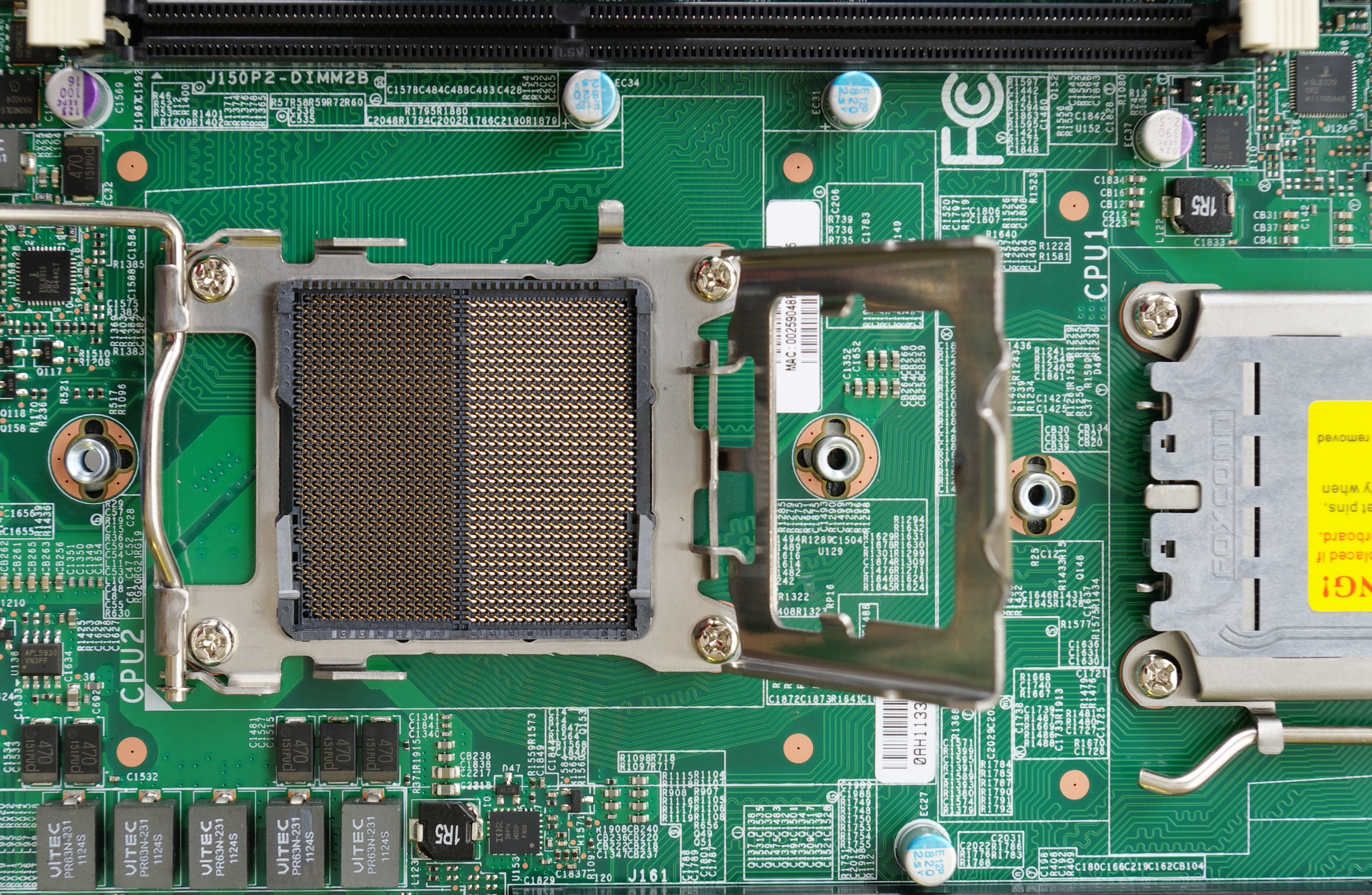
- Type: LGA-ZIF
- Chip form factors: Flip-chip
- Contacts: 1207
- FSB protocol: Two HyperTransport 3.1 links operating 6.40 GT/s or two HT 1.1 links operating at 800 MHz
- Processors: AMD Opteron 4000 series
- Predecessor: Socket F
- Variant: Socket G34
- Successor: Socket SP3
- Memory support: DDR3
- This article is part of the CPU socket series

Socket C32 is a zero insertion force land grid array CPU socket designed by AMD for their single-CPU and dual-CPU Opteron 4000 series server CPUs. It is the successor to Socket AM3 for single-CPU servers and the successor for Socket F for lower-end dual-CPU servers (High-end dual-CPU servers will use Socket G34). Socket C32 supports two DDR3 SDRAM channels. It is based on the Socket F and uses a similar 1207-pin LGA socket but is not physically or electrically compatible with Socket F due to the use of DDR3 SDRAM instead of the DDR2 SDRAM that Socket F platforms use.

Socket C32 was launched on June 23, 2010 as part of the San Marino platform with the four and six-core Opteron 4100 "Lisbon" processors.

Socket C32 also supports the Bulldozer-based six- and eight-core "Valencia" Opterons introduced in November 2011.

Both Socket C32 and its contemporary Socket G34 were succeeded in 2017 by Socket SP3 for both single- and dual-CPU servers, supporting Zen-based Epyc CPUs, the successors to all families of Opteron CPUs.

== Chipsets ==
Like Socket G34, it also uses the AMD SR5690, SR5670, and SR5650 chipsets. Socket C32 is also being used in the ultra-low-power Adelaide platform with the SR5650 chipset and HT1 interconnects instead of HT3.1.

== See also ==
- List of AMD microprocessors
- Opteron
