= AMD FX =

Series of high-end microprocessors by AMD

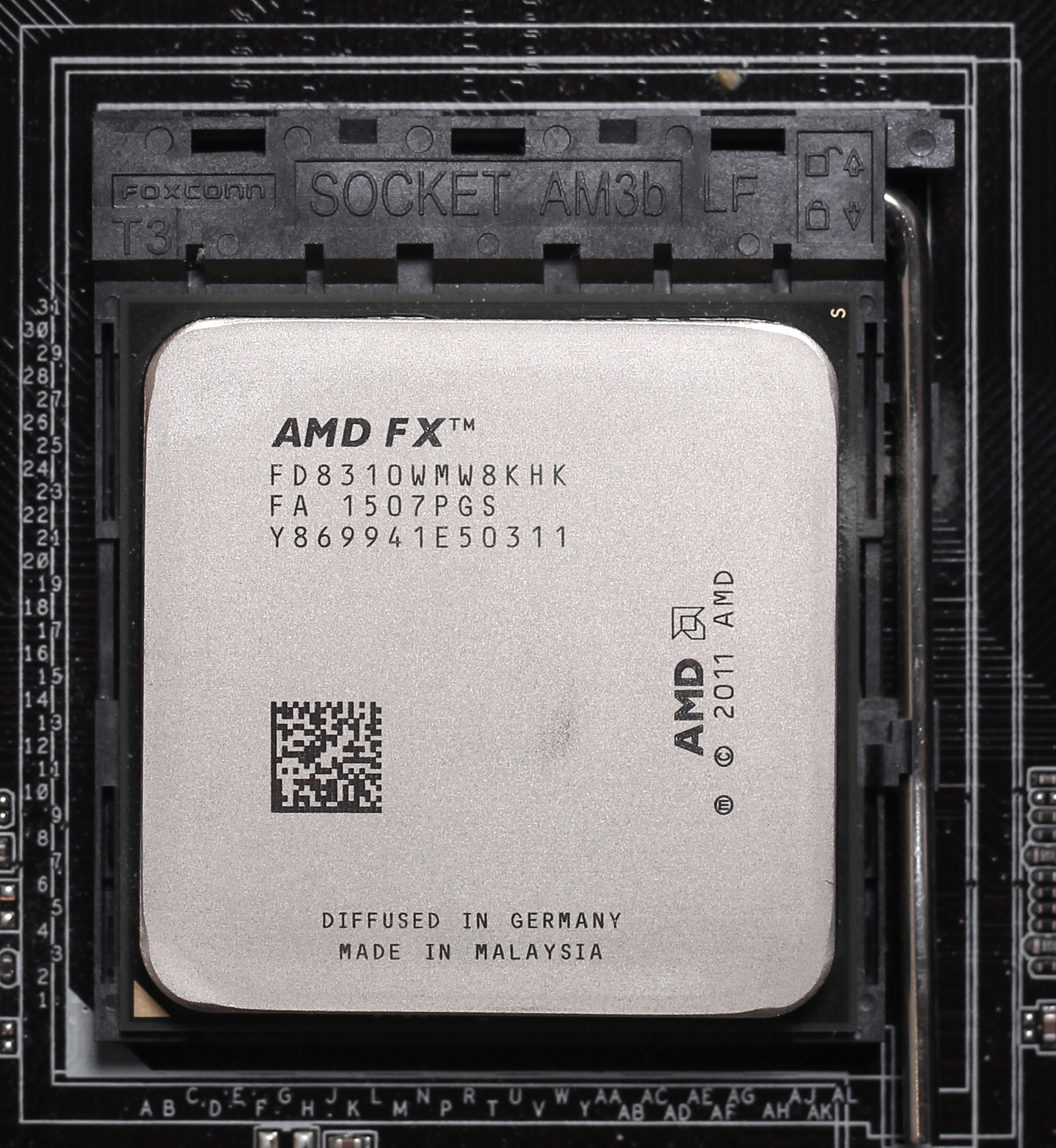
- An AMD FX 8310

General information
- Launched: October 2011
- Marketed by: AMD
- Designed by: AMD
- Common manufacturer: GlobalFoundries

Performance
- Max. CPU clock rate: 2.1 GHz to 5.0 GHz

Physical specifications
- Cores: 4, 6, 8
- Socket: AM3+

Architecture and classification
- Technology node: 32 nm to 28 nm
- Microarchitecture: Bulldozer, Piledriver
- Instruction set: AMD64/x86-64, MMX(+), SSE1, 2, 3, 3s, 4.1, 4.2, 4a, AES, CLMUL, AVX, XOP, FMA3, FMA4, CVT16/F16C, BMI1, ABM, TBM, AMD-V

Products, models, variants
- Core names: Zambezi; Vishera

History
- Predecessors: Athlon II; Phenom II
- Successor: Ryzen

AMD FX are a series of high-end AMD microprocessors for personal computers which debuted in 2011, claimed as AMD's first native 8-core desktop processor. The line was introduced with the Bulldozer microarchitecture at launch (codenamed "Zambezi"), and was then succeeded by its derivative Piledriver in 2012 (codenamed "Vishera").

The line aimed at competing with the Intel Core line of desktop processors, in particular processors based on Sandy Bridge and Ivy Bridge architectures.

FX has been succeeded by the Ryzen brand of CPUs, based on the Zen architecture, which initially launched in 2017 to compete with Intel's later generation processors such as Skylake.

== History ==
=== Prior to FX Launch ===
In the years prior to the AMD FX range of processors, the AMD Phenom II and Athlon II lineup of processors, while not beating Intel's Core lineup in raw performance, were generally competitive when their price was taken into account. By the end of Phenom's lifespan, however, Intel's Sandy Bridge-based Core processors could provide performance that Phenom II could not compete with. Rumors suggested that the FX line would change that as leaked information suggested improved performance on the upcoming Bulldozer architecture that AMD FX was based on.

=== FX Launch ===
The FX series launched on October 12, 2011, on the Bulldozer architecture. The launch lineup included the 4 core FX-4100 at $115, the 6 core FX-6100 at $165, and the 8 core FX-8120 at $205 and FX-8150 at $185. The FX refresh on the Piledriver architecture launched on October 23, 2012. The launch lineup included the refreshed 4 core FX-4300 at $122, 6 core FX-6300 at $132, and 8 core FX-8320 at $169 and FX-8350 at $195.

== Features ==
One notable feature of the AMD FX microprocessors is that they were all unlocked and overclockable, a feature usually reserved for the high-end K suffix SKUs from Intel. This allowed users to gain extra performance by raising the clock speed of their CPU. In 2012, the personal world record for highest overclock was achieved on an FX-8350, which was clocked up to 8794.33 MHz. This record was broken in 2024 using an Intel Core i9 14900KF; The FX-8350 continues to hold the AMD overclocking record.

- 4× dual-core "modules" within FX-8 series, 3× in FX-6 series, and 2× in FX-4 series, with two integer clusters (seen as logical cores from OS) and a shared floating-point unit in each "module".
- All models manufactured from 8 logical cores with simple Orochi die production, in 938 pins μPGA package AM3+ socket.
- All models support up to 4 DIMMs of DDR3 memory.

Unlike the majority of their Intel counterparts, FX chips offered no integrated graphics, a feature reserved for AMD's APU line of processors. Both Zambezi and Vishera used a module design containing two cores on one module.

== Reception ==
Upon launch, the FX series was met with criticism from reviewers. Due to multiple cores sharing common resources, most tasks were substantially slower on the FX lineup than the Intel Sandy Bridge equivalent. In many single-threaded applications, it was worse than the previous generation of Phenom II microprocessors. The power consumption of the lineup, while not as poor as the Phenom II generation, was still worse than what Intel was providing at the time. The Piledriver-based FX refresh in 2012 generally improved performance across the board by increasing clock speeds at similar power consumption levels, but Intel's Ivy Bridge architecture was available and provided much better performance per watt and total performance to consumers. With AMD only being responsible for 20% of consumer CPU sales in 2016, Intel continued to gain market share in the industry during the lifespan of the FX series.

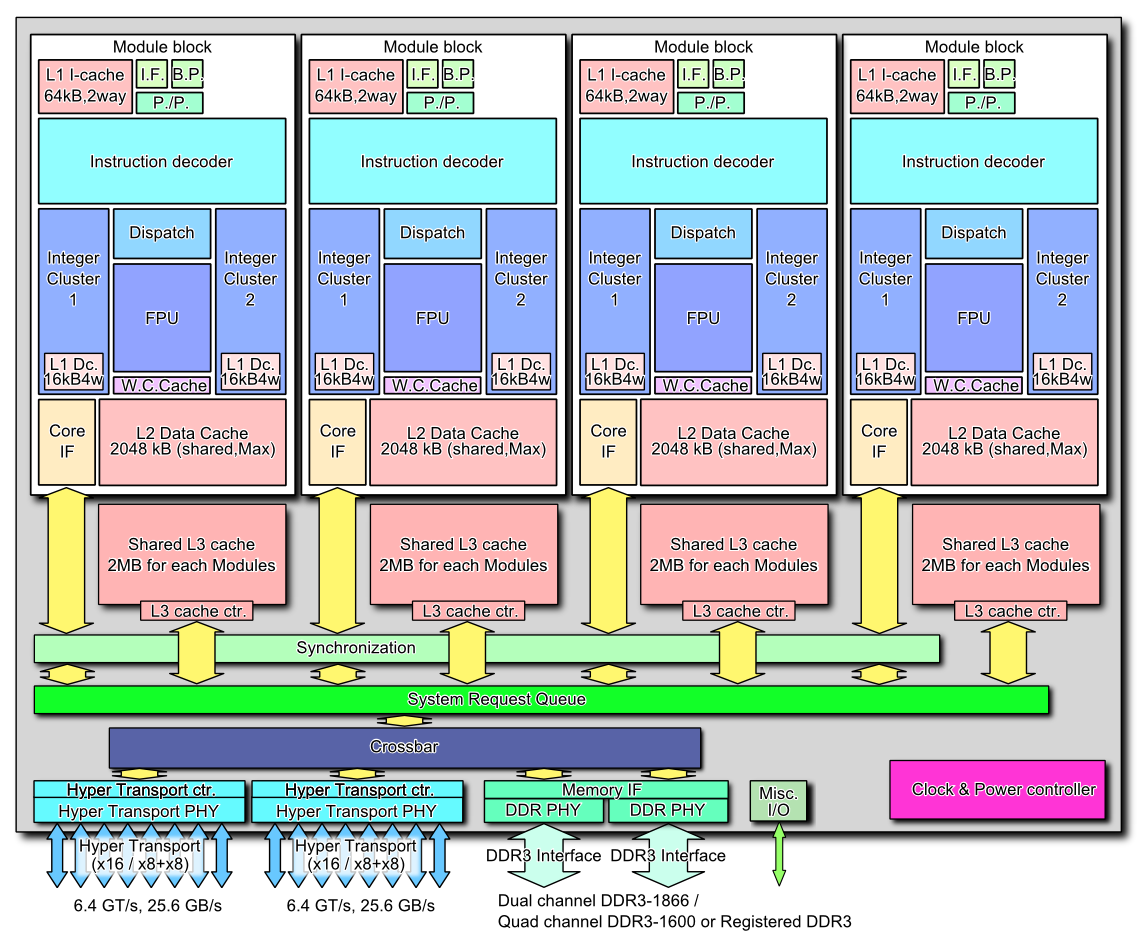
Block diagram of an "eight-core" AMD Bulldozer.

In 2015, AMD was accused of falsely advertising the core count of its FX lineup. The claim stated that every two cores shared one of multiple resources such as—but not limited to—the FPU (i.e two-core CPUs have one FPU, four-core CPUs have two FPUs, and eight-core CPUs have four FPUs). The company settled out-of-court and voluntarily paid out $12.1 million to California residents who bought a high-end FX chip.

== Performance ==
The AMD FX line-up generally performed worse than its Intel competitors during its lifespan. The floating-point performance was relatively poor due to a single shared FPU per module. Most games also could not take advantage of the high core counts that the series provided. In applications that benefitted from more threads, AMD SKUs typically pulled ahead. This came at a great cost, however, as thermal efficiency was often worse than the previous generation of processors. Updates to the architecture that came with the Piledriver revision allowed for higher clock speeds. This led to better performance, but that came with the cost of even higher thermal output on the high end, which can be seen with the FX-9590, with its TDP rating of 220 watts.

== Notes ==
- AMD later re-used the FX designation for some processors in its socket FM2/FM2+ APU lineup.

== See also ==
- List of AMD FX microprocessors
- AMD Accelerated Processing Unit
- Bulldozer Architecture
- Piledriver Architecture
- AMD Ryzen
- AMD Phenom II
- AMD Athlon II
