= Socket 940 =

CPU socket for old AMD CPUs

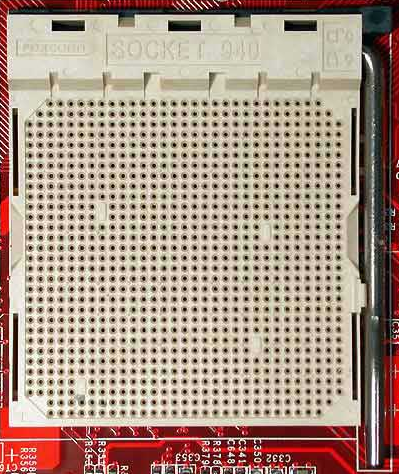
- Type: PGA-ZIF
- Chip form factors: OPGA
- Contacts: 940
- FSB frequency: 200 MHz System clock 800/1000 MHz HyperTransport link
- Voltage range: 0.8–1.55 V
- Processor dimensions: 40 mm × 40 mm 1,600 mm²
- Processors: AMD Athlon 64 FX; AMD Opteron
- Predecessor: Socket A
- Successor: Socket F
- This article is part of the CPU socket series

Socket 940 is a 940-pin socket for 64-bit AMD Opteron server processors and AMD Athlon 64 FX consumer processors. It was one of the first sockets designed for AMD's AMD64 range of processors.

This socket is entirely square in shape and pins are arranged in a grid with the exception of four key pins used to align the processor and the corners. AMD's Opteron and the older AMD Athlon 64 FX (FX-51) use Socket 940.

== Technical specifications ==
Microprocessors designed for this socket were intended to be used in a server platform, and as such provide additional features to provide additional robustness. One such feature is the acceptance of only registered memory.

While the more recent 940-pin socket AM2 is visually similar to this one, the two are electrically incompatible due to the integrated memory controller. Socket 940 CPUs integrate a DDR controller, whereas AM2 models use a DDR2 controller.

== See also ==
- List of AMD microprocessors
