= Socket F =

CPU socket for AMD server CPUs

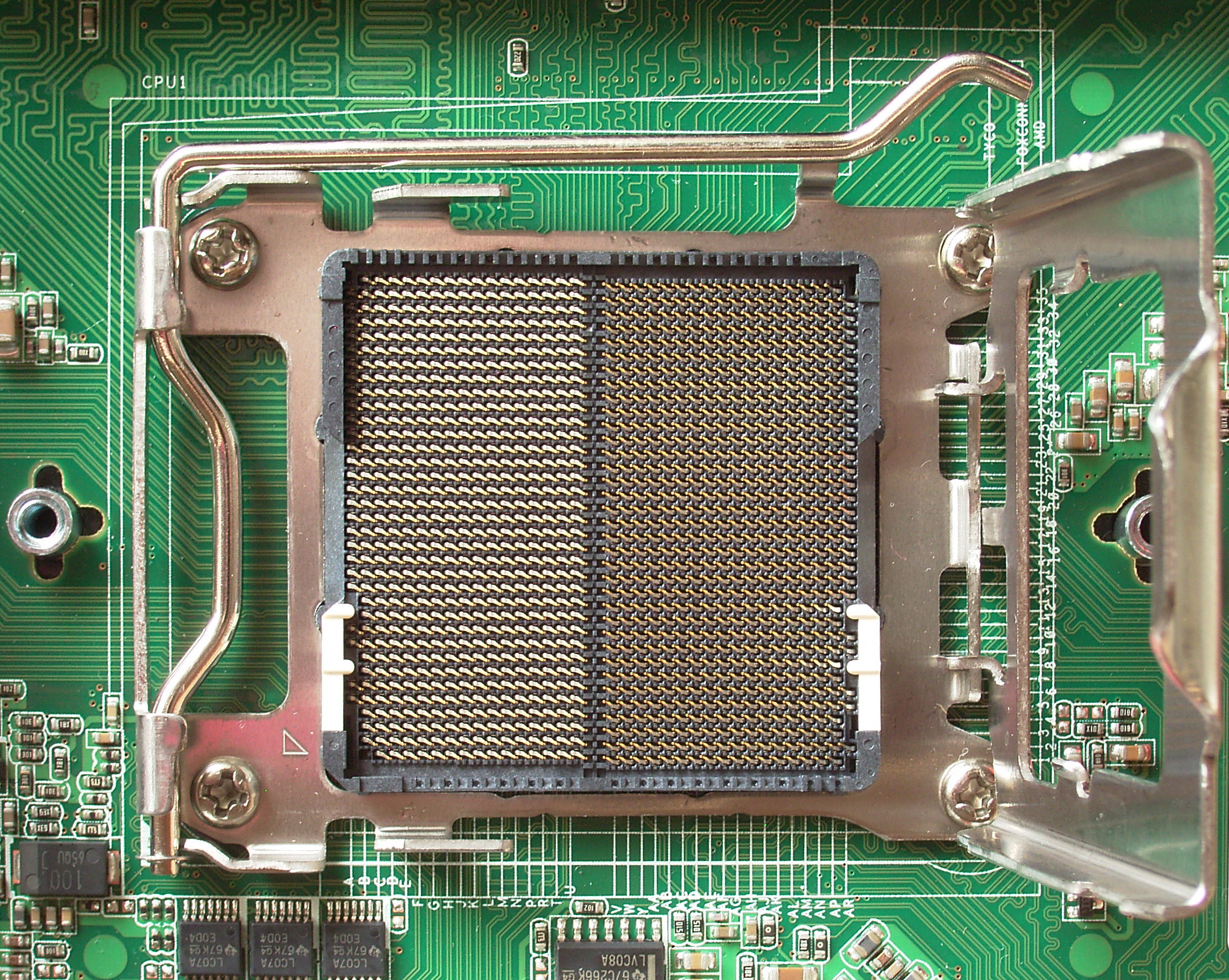
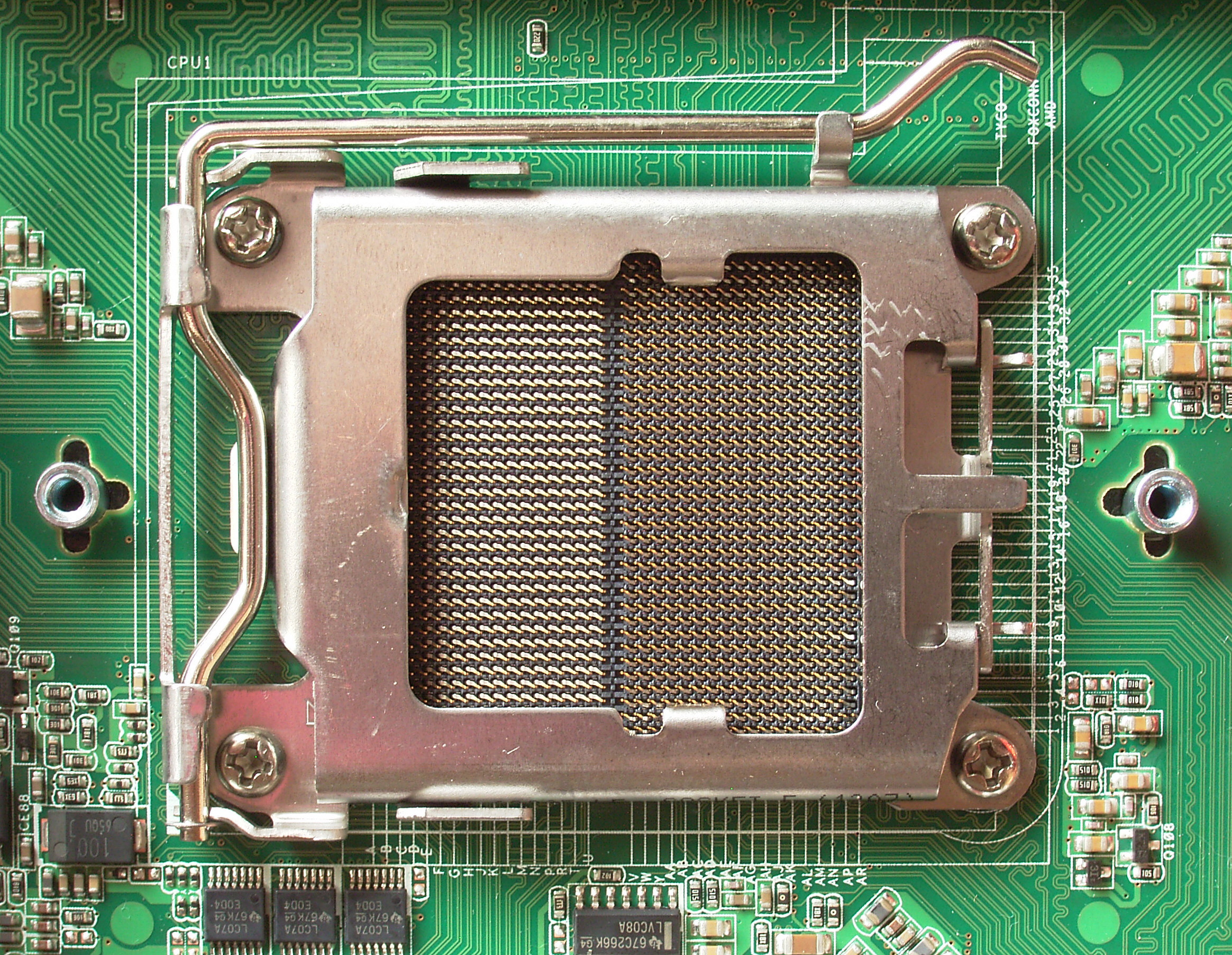
- Type: LGA
- Chip form factors: Flip-chip land grid array
- Contacts: 1207
- FSB frequency: 200 MHz System clock up to 2.4 GHz HyperTransport
- Processor dimensions: 40 × 40 mm
- Processors: Opteron 2xxx, 8xxx series Athlon 64 FX FX-7x series
- Predecessor: Socket 940
- Successor: Socket C32; Socket G34
- This article is part of the CPU socket series

Socket F is a CPU socket designed by AMD for its Opteron line of CPUs released on August 15, 2006. In 2010 Socket F was replaced by Socket C32 for entry-level servers and Socket G34 for high-end servers.

== Technical specifications ==
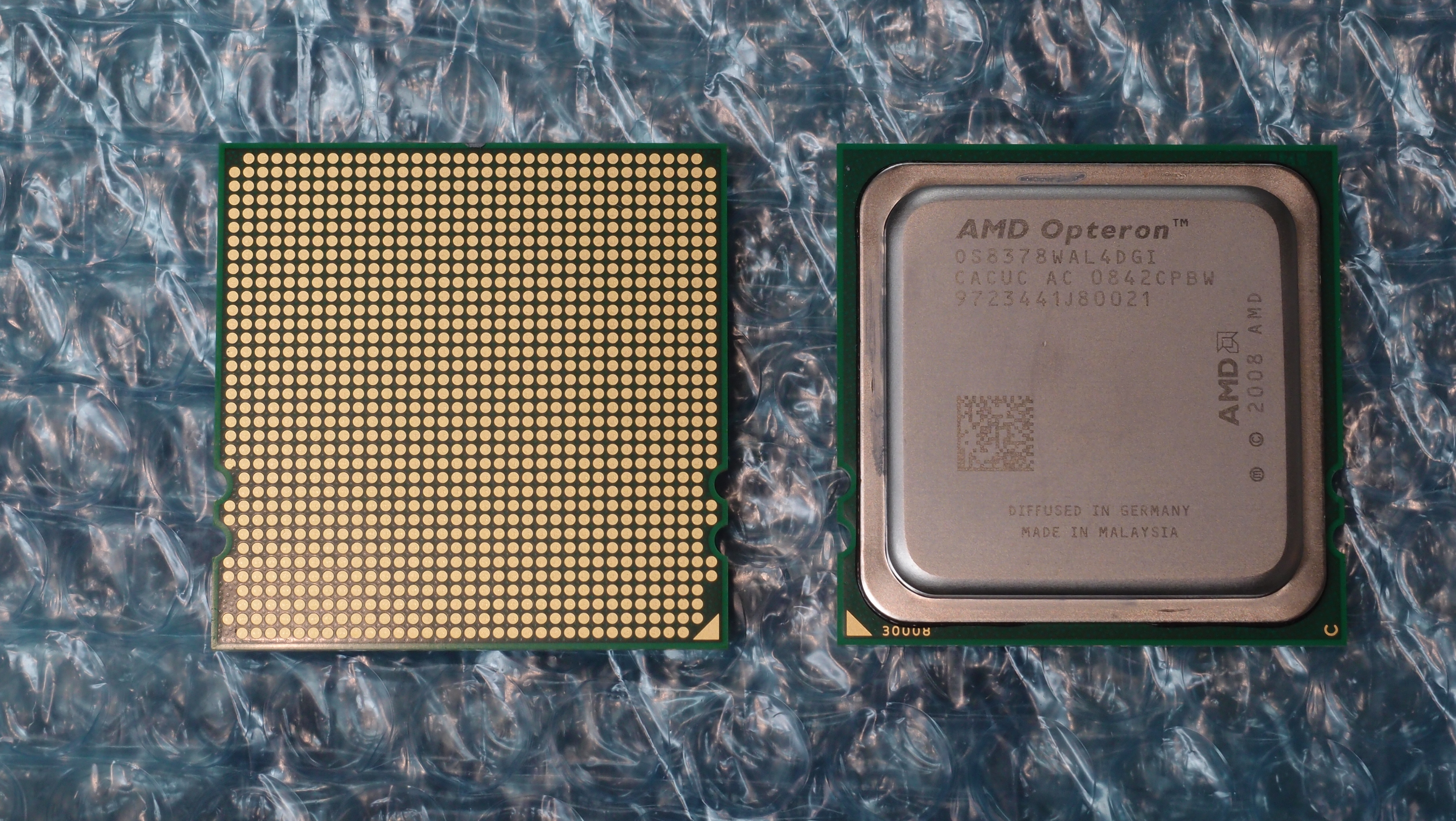
AMD Opteron 8378 (Socket F)

The socket has 1207 pins on a 1.1mm pitch and employs a land grid array contact mechanism.

Socket F is primarily for use in AMD's server line and is considered to be in the same socket generation as Socket AM2, which is used for the Athlon 64 and Athlon 64 X2; as well as Socket S1, which is used for Turion 64 and Turion 64 X2 microprocessors.

=== AMD Quad FX platform ===
Socket F is the base for the AMD Quad FX Platform (referred to as "4x4" or "QuadFather" prior to release), unveiled by AMD on November 30, 2006. This modified version of Socket F, named Socket 1207 FX by AMD, and Socket L1 by Nvidia, allows for dual-socket, dual-core (four effective cores and eight effective cores in the future) processors in desktop PCs for home enthusiasts.

== Socket F Revisions ==
All revisions except Socket Fr3 require the usage of registered DDR2 SDRAM. All revisions except Socket Fr1 require a dual-plane power-supply circuit for the CPU.

- Socket Fr1
  - Three HyperTransport 2.x links with 1 GHz, single-plane power-supply circuit
- Socket Fr2
  - Three HyperTransport 2.x links with 1 GHz, dual-plane power-supply circuit
- Socket Fr3
  - Three HyperTransport 2.x links with 1 GHz, unbuffered DDR2 SDRAM (special version for Quad-FX)
- Socket Fr5
  - CPU: Three HyperTransport 3.x links with 2.2 GHz
  - Motherboards: One HyperTransport 3.x link between CPU with 2.2 GHz, two HT 2.x links with 1 GHz for I/O operations
- Socket Fr6
  - Three Hypertransport 3.x links with 2.4 GHz, support for Snoop-Filter (HT-Assist)

== See also ==
- List of AMD Opteron microprocessors
