= Socket G34 =

CPU socket for AMD mobile CPUs

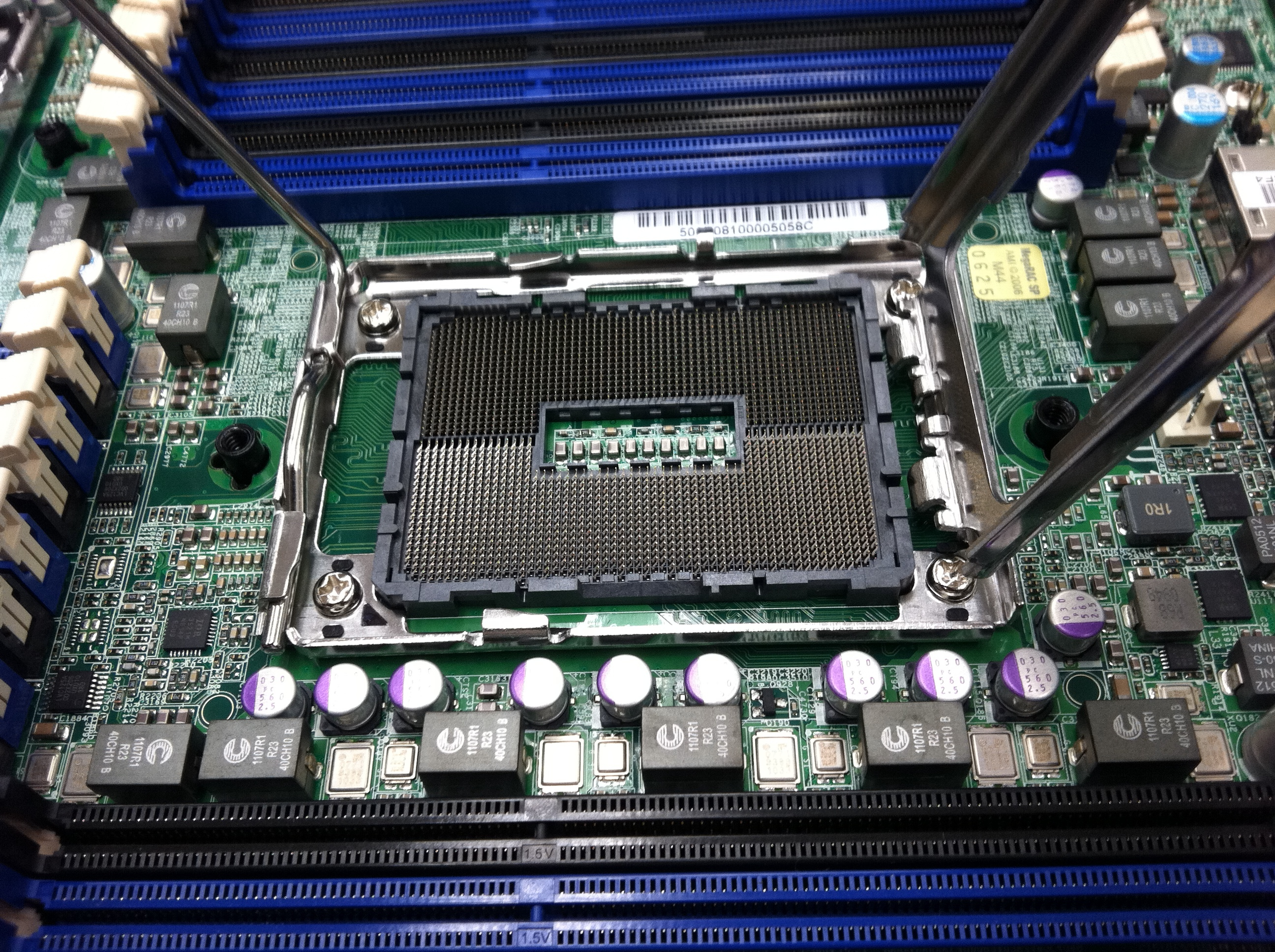
- Type: LGA
- Contacts: 1974 (Socket); 1944 (CPU)
- FSB protocol: HyperTransport 3.1
- FSB frequency: 200 MHz System clock HyperTransport up to 3.2 GHz
- Processors: AMD Opteron 6000 series server CPUs
- Predecessor: Socket F
- Variant: Socket C32
- Successor: Socket SP3
- This article is part of the CPU socket series

Socket G34 is a land grid array CPU socket designed by AMD to support AMD's multi-chip module Opteron 6000-series server processors. G34 was launched on March 29, 2010, alongside the initial grouping of Opteron 6100 processors designed for it. Socket G34 supports four DDR3 SDRAM channels, two for each die in the 1944 pin CPU package. Socket G34 is available in up to four-socket arrangements, which is a change from the Socket F CPUs supporting up to eight-socket arrangements. However, four Socket G34 CPUs have eight dies, which is identical to what eight Socket F CPUs have. AMD declined to extend Socket G34 to eight-way operation citing shrinking demand of the >4-socket market. AMD is targeting Socket G34 at the high-end two-socket market and the four-socket market. The lower-end two-socket market will be serviced by monolithic-die Socket C32 CPUs with half the core count as the equivalent Socket G34 CPUs.

Both Socket G34 and its contemporary Socket C32 were succeeded in 2017 by Socket SP3 for both single- and dual-CPU servers, supporting Zen-based Epyc CPUs, the successors to all families of Opteron CPUs.

== Development ==
Socket G34 originally started out as Socket G3, which used the G3MX to expand memory capacity. Socket G3 and G3MX were canceled altogether, and replaced with Socket G34.

== Supported CPUs ==
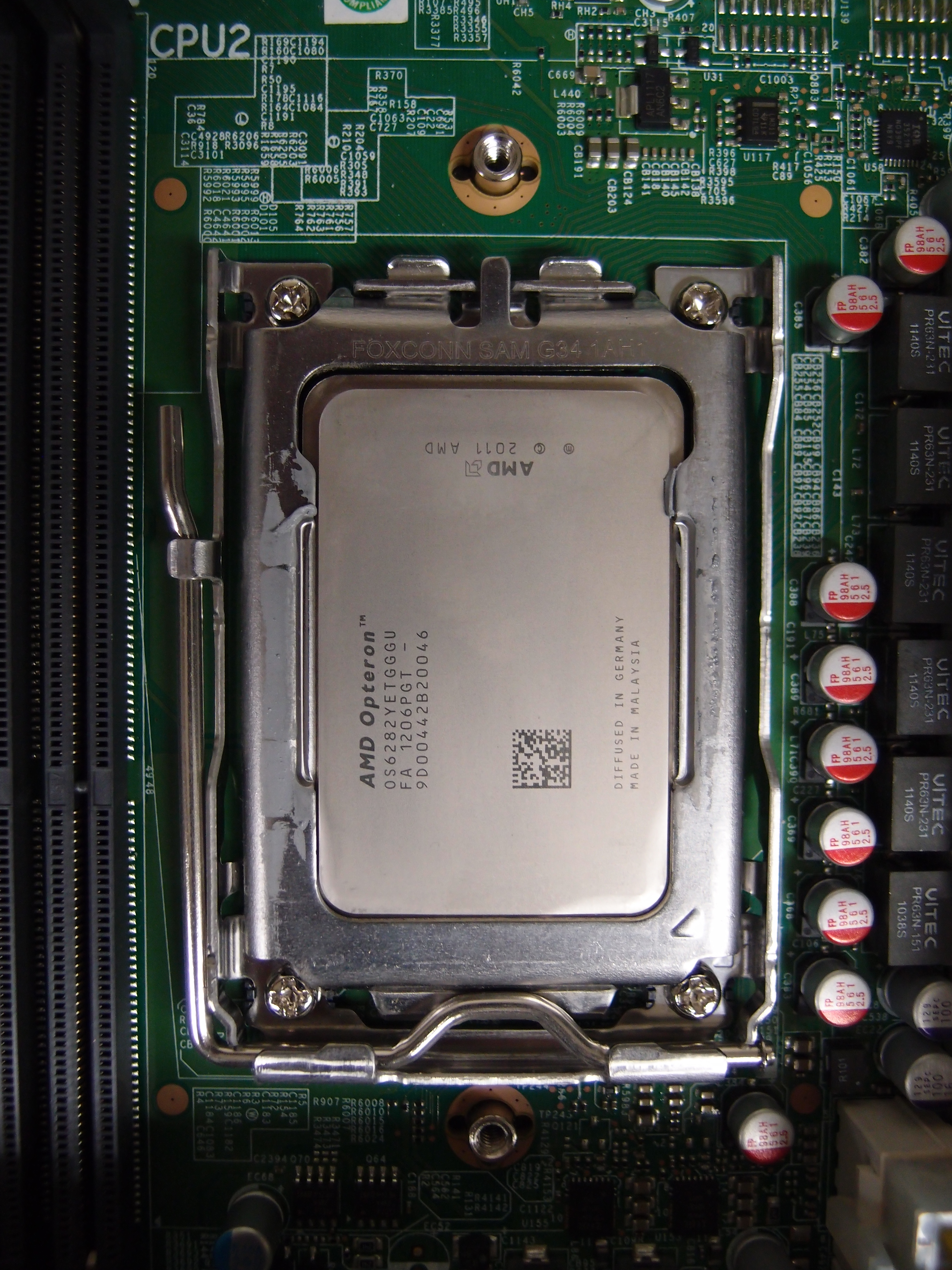
AMD Opteron 6282 SE on socket G34

Socket G34 was introduced in March 2010 with the K10-based 8-core and 12-core "Magny-Cours" Opteron 6100 series CPUs. Socket G34 also supports the Bulldozer-based 4-core, 8-core, 12-core and 16-core Opteron 6200 "Interlagos" CPUs and the Piledriver-based 4-core, 8-core, 12-core and 16-core Opteron 6300 "Abu Dhabi" CPUs.

== See also ==
- List of AMD microprocessors
- List of AMD Opteron microprocessors
- AMD 800 chipset series
