= Table of AMD processors =

| Architecture | Fabrication (nm) | Family | Release Date | Code name | Model Group | Cores | SMT | Clock rate (MHz) | Bus Speed & Type (Note: Type can be Front side bus (FSB), HyperTransport (HT), Unified Media Interface (UMI), or PCI Express (PCIe).) | Cache | | | Socket | Memory Controller | Features | | | |
| Architecture | Fabrication (nm) | Family | Release Date | Code name | Model Group | Cores | SMT | Clock rate (MHz) | Bus Speed & Type | L1 | L2 | L3 | Socket | Memory Controller | SIMD | Speed/Power | Other | Changes |
|---|---|---|---|---|---|---|---|---|---|---|---|---|---|---|---|---|---|---|
| Am386 | | Am386 | | Sx/SxL/SxLV | | 1 | No | 25–40 | FSB | | | | 100 PQFP | discrete | | | | |
| Am486 | 500, 350 | Am486 | | | | 1 | No | 25–120 | FSB | 8 | | | 168 pin PGA; 208 SQFP | discrete | | | | |
| Am486 | 500, 350 | Enhanced Am486 | | | | 1 | No | 66–120 | FSB | 8, 8/16 | | | 168 pin PGA; 208 SQFP | discrete | | | | |
| Am5x86 | 350 | Am5x86 | | X5-133 | | 1 | No | 133 | 33; FSB | 16 | | | Socket 3 Socket 2 Socket 1; 168 pin | discrete | | | | |
| K5 | 500, 350 | AMD K5 | | SSA/5, 5k86 | | 1 | No | 75–133 | 50, 60, 66; FSB | 8+16 | 0 | | Socket 5 Socket 7 | discrete | | | | |
| K6 | 350, 250 | AMD K6 | | Model 6, Littlefoot | | 1 | No | 166–300 | 50, 60, 66; FSB | 32+32 | 0 | | Socket 7 | discrete | MMX | | | + MMX |
| K6 | 250, 180 | AMD K6-2 | | Chomper, Chomper Extended, mobile | | 1 | No | 166–550 | 66, 95, 97, 100; FSB | 32+32 | 0, 128 | | Super Socket 7 | discrete | MMX, 3DNow! | | | + 3DNow! |
| K6 | 250, 180 | K6-3 | | Sharptooth | | 1 | No | 400–550 | 66, 95, 96.2, 100; FSB | 32+32 | 256 | 512, 1024 | Super Socket 7 | discrete | MMX, 3DNow! | | | + 3DNow! |
| K7 | 250 | Athlon | | Argon | | 1 | No | 500–700 | 100; FSB | 64+64 | 512 | | Slot A | discrete | MMX, 3DNow! | | | |
| K7 | 180 | Athlon | | Pluto/Orion | | 1 | No | 550–1000 | 100; FSB | 64+64 | 512 | | Slot A | discrete | MMX, 3DNow! | | | |
| K7 | 180 | Athlon | | Thunderbird | | 1 | No | 1000–1400 | 100; FSB | 64+64 | 256 | | Slot A Socket A | discrete | MMX, 3DNow! | | | |
| K7 | 180 | Athlon XP/MP | | Palomino | 1500+ – 2100+ | 1 | No | 1333–1733 | 133; FSB | 64+64 | 256 | | Socket A | discrete | MMX, 3DNow!+, SSE | | | + 3DNow!+ + SSE |
| K7 | 130 | Athlon XP/MP | | Thoroughbred | 1600+ – 2800+ | 1 | No | 1400–2250 | 133, 166, 200; FSB | 64+64 | 256 | | Socket A | discrete | MMX, 3DNow!+, SSE | | | + 3DNow!+ + SSE |
| K7 | 130 | Athlon XP/MP | | Thorton | 2000+ – 3100+ | 1 | No | 1667–2200 | 133, 166, 200; FSB | 64+64 | 256 | | Socket A | discrete | MMX, 3DNow!+, SSE | | | + 3DNow!+ + SSE |
| K7 | 130 | Athlon XP/MP | | Barton | 2500+ – 3200+ | 1 | No | 1833–2333 | 133, 166, 200; FSB | 64+64 | 512 | | Socket A | discrete | MMX, 3DNow!+, SSE | | | + 3DNow!+ + SSE |
| K7 | 180 | Duron | | Spitfire | | 1 | No | 600–950 | 100; FSB | 64+64 | 64 | | Socket A | discrete | MMX, 3DNow!+, SSE | | | + 3DNow!+ + SSE |
| K7 | 180 | Duron | | Morgan | | 1 | No | 900–1300 | 100; FSB | 64+64 | 64 | | Socket A | discrete | MMX, 3DNow!+, SSE | | | + 3DNow!+ + SSE |
| K7 | 130 | Duron | | Applebred | | 1 | No | 1400, 1600, 1800 | 133; FSB | 64+64 | 64 | | Socket A | discrete | MMX, 3DNow!+, SSE | | | + 3DNow!+ + SSE |
| K7 | 180 | Athlon 4 | | Corvette | | 1 | No | 850–1400 | 100; FSB | 64+64 | 256 | | Socket A | discrete | MMX, 3DNow!+, SSE | | | + 3DNow!+ + SSE |
| K7 | 130 | Athlon XP-M | | Thoroughbred | | 1 | No | 1400–2133 | 100, 133; FSB | 64+64 | 256 | | Socket A | discrete | MMX, 3DNow!+, SSE | | | + 3DNow!+ + SSE |
| K7 | 130 | Athlon XP-M | | Barton | | 1 | No | 1667–2200 | 133; FSB | 64+64 | 512 | | Socket A | discrete | MMX, 3DNow!+, SSE | | | + 3DNow!+ + SSE |
| K7 | 180 | Mobile Duron | | Spitfire | | 1 | No | 600, 700 | 100; FSB | 64+64 | 64 | | Socket A | discrete | MMX, 3DNow!+, SSE | | | + 3DNow!+ + SSE |
| K7 | 180 | Mobile Duron | | Camaro | | 1 | No | 800–1300 | 100; FSB | 64+64 | 64 | | Socket A | discrete | MMX, 3DNow!+, SSE | | | + 3DNow!+ + SSE |
| K7 | 130 | Sempron | | Thoroughbred-B | | 1 | No | 1500–2000 | 166; FSB | 64+64 | 256 | | Socket A | discrete | MMX, 3DNow!+, SSE | | | + 3DNow!+ + SSE |
| K7 | 130 | Sempron | | Thorton | | 1 | No | 1500–2000 | 166; FSB | 64+64 | 256 | | Socket A | discrete | MMX, 3DNow!+, SSE | | | + 3DNow!+ + SSE |
| K7 | 130 | Sempron | | Barton | | 1 | No | 2000–2200 | 166, 200; FSB | 64+64 | 512 | | Socket A | discrete | MMX, 3DNow!+, SSE | | | + 3DNow!+ + SSE |
| K8 | 130 | Opteron | | Sledgehammer | 100 | 1 | No | 1400–2400 | 800; HT | 64+64 | 1024 | | Socket 940 | DDR | MMX, 3DNow!+, SSE, SSE2 | PowerNow! | AMD64, ccNUMA | + SSE2 + PowerNow! + AMD64 + NX Bit |
| K8 | 130 | Opteron | | Sledgehammer | 200 | 1 | No | 1400–2400 | 800; HT | 64+64 | 1024 | | Socket 940 | DDR | MMX, 3DNow!+, SSE, SSE2 | PowerNow! | AMD64, ccNUMA | + SSE2 + PowerNow! + AMD64 + NX Bit |
| K8 | 130 | Opteron | | Sledgehammer | 800 | 1 | No | 1400–2400 | 800; HT | 64+64 | 1024 | | Socket 940 | DDR | MMX, 3DNow!+, SSE, SSE2 | PowerNow! | AMD64, ccNUMA | + SSE2 + PowerNow! + AMD64 + NX Bit |
| K8 | 90 | Opteron | | Venus | 100 | 1 | No | 1600–3000 | 800; HT | 64+64 | 1024 | | Socket 939 | DDR | MMX, 3DNow!+, SSE, SSE2 | PowerNow! | AMD64, ccNUMA | + SSE2 + PowerNow! + AMD64 + NX Bit |
| K8 | 90 | Opteron | | Troy | 200 | 1 | No | 1600–3000 | 800; HT | 64+64 | 1024 | | Socket 940 | DDR | MMX, 3DNow!+, SSE, SSE2 | PowerNow! | AMD64, ccNUMA | + SSE2 + PowerNow! + AMD64 + NX Bit |
| K8 | 90 | Opteron | | Athens | 800 | 1 | No | 1600–3000 | 800; HT | 64+64 | 1024 | | Socket 940 | DDR | MMX, 3DNow!+, SSE, SSE2 | PowerNow! | AMD64, ccNUMA | + SSE2 + PowerNow! + AMD64 + NX Bit |
| K8 | 90 | Opteron | | Denmark | 100 | 2 | No | 1600–3200 | 1000; HT | 64+64 | 1024 | | Socket 939 | DDR | MMX, 3DNow!+, SSE, SSE2 | PowerNow! | AMD64, NX Bit | + SSE2 + PowerNow! + AMD64 + NX Bit |
| K8 | 90 | Opteron | | Italy | 200 | 2 | No | 1600–3200 | 1000; HT | 64+64 | 1024 | | Socket 940 | DDR | MMX, 3DNow!+, SSE, SSE2 | PowerNow! | AMD64, NX Bit, ccNUMA | + SSE2 + PowerNow! + AMD64 + NX Bit |
| K8 | 90 | Opteron | | Egypt | 800 | 2 | No | 1600–3200 | 1000; HT | 64+64 | 1024 | | Socket 940 | DDR | MMX, 3DNow!+, SSE, SSE2 | PowerNow! | AMD64, NX Bit, ccNUMA | + SSE2 + PowerNow! + AMD64 + NX Bit |
| K8 | 90 | Opteron | | Santa Ana | 1200 | 2 | No | 1800–3200 | 1000; HT | 64+64 | 1024 | | Socket AM2 | DDR2 | MMX, 3DNow!+, SSE, SSE2 | PowerNow! | AMD64, NX Bit | + SSE2 + PowerNow! + AMD64 + NX Bit |
| K8 | 90 | Opteron | | Santa Rosa | 2200 | 2 | No | 1800–3200 | 1000; HT | 64+64 | 1024 | | Socket F | DDR2 | MMX, 3DNow!+, SSE, SSE2 | PowerNow! | AMD64, NX Bit | + SSE2 + PowerNow! + AMD64 + NX Bit |
| K8 | 90 | Opteron | | Santa Rosa | 8200 | 2 | No | 2000–3000 | 1000; HT | 64+64 | 1024 | | Socket F | DDR2 | MMX, 3DNow!+, SSE, SSE2 | PowerNow! | AMD64, NX Bit | + SSE2 + PowerNow! + AMD64 + NX Bit |
| K8 | 130 | Athlon 64 FX | | Sledgehammer | FX-51, FX-53 | 1 | No | 2200, 2400 | 800; HT | 64+64 | 1024 | | Socket 940 | DDR | MMX, 3DNow!+, SSE, SSE2, SSE3 | Cool'n'Quiet | AMD64, NX Bit | + SSE3: PowerNow!; + Cool'n'Quiet + AMD-V |
| K8 | 130 | Athlon 64 FX | | Clawhammer | FX-53, FX-55 | 1 | No | 2400, 2400 | 1000; HT | 64+64 | 1024 | | Socket 939 | DDR | MMX, 3DNow!+, SSE, SSE2, SSE3 | Cool'n'Quiet | AMD64, NX Bit | + SSE3: PowerNow!; + Cool'n'Quiet + AMD-V |
| K8 | 90 | Athlon 64 FX | | San Diego | FX-55, FX-57 | 1 | No | 2600, 2800 | 1000; HT | 64+64 | 1024 | | Socket 939 | DDR | MMX, 3DNow!+, SSE, SSE2, SSE3 | Cool'n'Quiet | AMD64, NX Bit | + SSE3: PowerNow!; + Cool'n'Quiet + AMD-V |
| K8 | 90 | Athlon 64 FX | | Toledo | FX-60 | 2 | No | 2600 | 1000; HT | 64+64 | 1024 | | Socket 939 | DDR | MMX, 3DNow!+, SSE, SSE2, SSE3 | Cool'n'Quiet | AMD64, NX Bit | + SSE3: PowerNow!; + Cool'n'Quiet + AMD-V |
| K8 | 90 | Athlon 64 FX | | Windsor | FX-62 | 2 | No | 2800 | 1000; HT | 64+64 | 1024 | | Socket AM2 | DDR2 | MMX, 3DNow!+, SSE, SSE2, SSE3 | Cool'n'Quiet | AMD64, NX Bit, AMD-V | + SSE3: PowerNow!; + Cool'n'Quiet + AMD-V |
| K8 | 90 | Athlon 64 FX | | Windsor | FX-70, FX-72, FX-74 | 2 | No | 2600, 2800, 3000 | 1000; HT | 64+64 | 1024 | | Socket F | DDR2 | MMX, 3DNow!+, SSE, SSE2, SSE3 | Cool'n'Quiet | AMD64, NX Bit, AMD-V | + SSE3: PowerNow!; + Cool'n'Quiet + AMD-V |
| K8 | 130 | Athlon 64 | | Clawhammer | | 1 | No | 2000–2600 | 800; HT | 64+64 | 1024 | | Socket 754 | DDR | MMX, 3DNow!+, SSE, SSE2 | Cool'n'Quiet | AMD64, NX Bit (not in CG stepping) | + SSE3: PowerNow!; + Cool'n'Quiet + AMD-V |
| K8 | 130 | Athlon 64 | | Clawhammer | | 1 | No | 2000–2600 | 1000; HT | 64+64 | 1024 | | Socket 939 | DDR | MMX, 3DNow!+, SSE, SSE2 | Cool'n'Quiet | AMD64, NX Bit (not in CG stepping) | + SSE3: PowerNow!; + Cool'n'Quiet + AMD-V |
| K8 | 130 | Athlon 64 | | Newcastle | | 1 | No | 1800–2400 | 800; HT | 64+64 | 512 | | Socket 754 | DDR | MMX, 3DNow!+, SSE, SSE2 | Cool'n'Quiet | AMD64, NX Bit | + SSE3: PowerNow!; + Cool'n'Quiet + AMD-V |
| K8 | 130 | Athlon 64 | | Newcastle | | 1 | No | 1800–2400 | 1000; HT | 64+64 | 512 | | Socket 939 | DDR | MMX, 3DNow!+, SSE, SSE2 | Cool'n'Quiet | AMD64, NX Bit | + SSE3: PowerNow!; + Cool'n'Quiet + AMD-V |
| K8 | 90 | Athlon 64 | | Winchester | | 1 | No | 1800–2200 | 1000; HT | 64+64 | 512 | | Socket 939 | DDR | MMX, 3DNow!+, SSE, SSE2 | Cool'n'Quiet | AMD64, NX Bit | + SSE3: PowerNow!; + Cool'n'Quiet + AMD-V |
| K8 | 90 | Athlon 64 | | Venice | | 1 | No | 1800–2400 | 800; HT | 64+64 | 512 | | Socket 754 | DDR | MMX, 3DNow!+, SSE, SSE2, SSE3 | Cool'n'Quiet | AMD64, NX Bit | + SSE3: PowerNow!; + Cool'n'Quiet + AMD-V |
| K8 | 90 | Athlon 64 | | Venice | | 1 | No | 1800–2400 | 1000; HT | 64+64 | 512 | | Socket 939 | DDR | MMX, 3DNow!+, SSE, SSE2, SSE3 | Cool'n'Quiet | AMD64, NX Bit | + SSE3: PowerNow!; + Cool'n'Quiet + AMD-V |
| K8 | 90 | Athlon 64 | | San Diego | | 1 | No | 2200–2600 | 1000; HT | 64+64 | 1024 | | Socket 939 | DDR | MMX, 3DNow!+, SSE, SSE2, SSE3 | Cool'n'Quiet | AMD64, NX Bit | + SSE3: PowerNow!; + Cool'n'Quiet + AMD-V |
| K8 | 90 | Athlon 64 | | Orleans | | 1 | No | 1800–2600 | 1000; HT | 64+64 | 512 | | Socket AM2 | DDR2 | MMX, 3DNow!+, SSE, SSE2, SSE3 | Cool'n'Quiet | AMD64, NX Bit, AMD-V | + SSE3: PowerNow!; + Cool'n'Quiet + AMD-V |
| K8 | 65 | Athlon 64 | | Lima | | 1 | No | 2000–2800 | 1000; HT | 64+64 | 512 | | Socket AM2 | DDR2 | MMX, 3DNow!+, SSE, SSE2, SSE3 | Cool'n'Quiet | AMD64, NX Bit, AMD-V | + SSE3: PowerNow!; + Cool'n'Quiet + AMD-V |
| K8 | 90 | Athlon 64 X2 | | Manchester | 3600+ | 2 | No | 2000 | 1000; HT | 64+64 | 256 PC, FS | | Socket 939 | DDR | MMX, 3DNow!+, SSE, SSE2, SSE3 | Cool'n'Quiet | AMD64, NX Bit | + SSE3: PowerNow!; + Cool'n'Quiet + AMD-V |
| K8 | 90 | Athlon 64 X2 | | Manchester | 3800+, 4200+, 4600+ | 2 | No | 2000, 2200, 2400 | 1000; HT | 64+64 | 512 PC, FS | | Socket 939 | DDR | MMX, 3DNow!+, SSE, SSE2, SSE3 | Cool'n'Quiet | AMD64, NX Bit | + SSE3: PowerNow!; + Cool'n'Quiet + AMD-V |
| K8 | 90 | Athlon 64 X2 | | Toledo | 3800+, 4200+, 4600+ | 2 | No | 2000, 2200, 2400 | 1000; HT | 64+64 | 512 PC, FS | | Socket 939 | DDR | MMX, 3DNow!+, SSE, SSE2, SSE3 | Cool'n'Quiet | AMD64, NX Bit | + SSE3: PowerNow!; + Cool'n'Quiet + AMD-V |
| K8 | 90 | Athlon 64 X2 | | Toledo | 4400+, 4800+ | 2 | No | 2200, 2400 | 1000; HT | 64+64 | 1024 PC, FS | | Socket 939 | DDR | MMX, 3DNow!+, SSE, SSE2, SSE3 | Cool'n'Quiet | AMD64, NX Bit | + SSE3: PowerNow!; + Cool'n'Quiet + AMD-V |
| K8 | 90 | Athlon 64 X2 | | Windsor | 3600+ | 2 | No | 2000 | 1000; HT | 64+64 | 256 PC, FS | | Socket AM2 | DDR2 | MMX, 3DNow!+, SSE, SSE2, SSE3 | Cool'n'Quiet | AMD64, NX Bit, AMD-V | + SSE3: PowerNow!; + Cool'n'Quiet + AMD-V |
| K8 | 90 | Athlon 64 X2 | | Windsor | 3800+, 4200+, 4600+, 5000+, 5400+ | 2 | No | 2000, 2200, 2400, 2600, 2800 | 1000; HT | 64+64 | 512 PC, FS | | Socket AM2 | DDR2 | MMX, 3DNow!+, SSE, SSE2, SSE3 | Cool'n'Quiet | AMD64, NX Bit, AMD-V | + SSE3: PowerNow!; + Cool'n'Quiet + AMD-V |
| K8 | 90 | Athlon 64 X2 | | Windsor | 4000+, 4400+, 4800+, 5200+, 5600+, 6000+, 6400+ | 2 | No | 2000, 2200, 2400, 2600, 2800, 3000, 3200 | 1000; HT | 64+64 | 1024 PC, FS | | Socket AM2 | DDR2 | MMX, 3DNow!+, SSE, SSE2, SSE3 | Cool'n'Quiet | AMD64, NX Bit, AMD-V | + SSE3: PowerNow!; + Cool'n'Quiet + AMD-V |
| K8 | 65 | Athlon 64 X2 | | Brisbane | 3600+, 3800+, 4000+, 4200+, 4400+, 4600+, 4800+, 5000+, 5200+, 5400+, 5600+, 5800+, 6000+ | 2 | No | 1900, 2000, 2100, 2200, 2300, 2400, 2500, 2600, 2700, 2800, 2900, 3000, 3100 | 1000; HT | 64+64 | 512 PC, FS | | Socket AM2 | DDR2 | MMX, 3DNow!+, SSE, SSE2, SSE3 | Cool'n'Quiet | AMD64, NX Bit, AMD-V | + SSE3: PowerNow!; + Cool'n'Quiet + AMD-V |
| K8 | 130 | Sempron | | Paris | 3000+ | 1 | No | 1800 | 800; HT | 64+64 | 128 | | Socket 754 | | MMX, 3DNow!+, SSE, SSE2, SSE3 | Cool'n'Quiet | NX Bit | + SSE3: PowerNow!; + Cool'n'Quiet + AMD-V |
| K8 | 130 | Sempron | | Paris | 3100+ | 1 | No | 1800 | 800; HT | 64+64 | 256 | | Socket 754 | | MMX, 3DNow!+, SSE, SSE2, SSE3 | Cool'n'Quiet | NX Bit | + SSE3: PowerNow!; + Cool'n'Quiet + AMD-V |
| K8 | 90 | Sempron | | Palermo | 2500+ | 1 | No | 1400 | 800; HT | 64+64 | 256 | | Socket 754 | | MMX, 3DNow!+, SSE, SSE2, SSE3 | | AMD64, NX Bit | + SSE3: PowerNow!; + Cool'n'Quiet + AMD-V |
| K8 | 90 | Sempron | | Palermo | 2600+ | 1 | No | 1600 | 800; HT | 64+64 | 128 | | Socket 754 | | MMX, 3DNow!+, SSE, SSE2, SSE3 | | AMD64, NX Bit | + SSE3: PowerNow!; + Cool'n'Quiet + AMD-V |
| K8 | 90 | Sempron | | Palermo | 2800+ | 1 | No | 1600 | 800; HT | 64+64 | 256 | | Socket 754 | | MMX, 3DNow!+, SSE, SSE2, SSE3 | | AMD64, NX Bit | + SSE3: PowerNow!; + Cool'n'Quiet + AMD-V |
| K8 | 90 | Sempron | | Palermo | 3000+ | 1 | No | 1800 | 800; HT | 64+64 | 128 | | Socket 754 | | MMX, 3DNow!+, SSE, SSE2, SSE3 | Cool'n'Quiet | AMD64, NX Bit | + SSE3: PowerNow!; + Cool'n'Quiet + AMD-V |
| K8 | 90 | Sempron | | Palermo | 3100+ | 1 | No | 1800 | 800; HT | 64+64 | 256 | | Socket 754 | | MMX, 3DNow!+, SSE, SSE2, SSE3 | Cool'n'Quiet | AMD64, NX Bit | + SSE3: PowerNow!; + Cool'n'Quiet + AMD-V |
| K8 | 90 | Sempron | | Palermo | 3300+ | 1 | No | 2000 | 800; HT | 64+64 | 128 | | Socket 754 | | MMX, 3DNow!+, SSE, SSE2, SSE3 | Cool'n'Quiet | AMD64, NX Bit | + SSE3: PowerNow!; + Cool'n'Quiet + AMD-V |
| K8 | 90 | Sempron | | Palermo | 3400+ | 1 | No | 2000 | 800; HT | 64+64 | 256 | | Socket 754 | | MMX, 3DNow!+, SSE, SSE2, SSE3 | Cool'n'Quiet | AMD64, NX Bit | + SSE3: PowerNow!; + Cool'n'Quiet + AMD-V |
| K8 | 90 | Sempron | | Palermo | 3000+ | 1 | No | 1800 | 800; HT | 64+64 | 128 | | Socket 939 | | MMX, 3DNow!+, SSE, SSE2, SSE3 | | AMD64, NX Bit | + SSE3: PowerNow!; + Cool'n'Quiet + AMD-V |
| K8 | 90 | Sempron | | Palermo | 3200+ | 1 | No | 1800 | 800; HT | 64+64 | 256 | | Socket 939 | | MMX, 3DNow!+, SSE, SSE2, SSE3 | | AMD64, NX Bit | + SSE3: PowerNow!; + Cool'n'Quiet + AMD-V |
| K8 | 90 | Sempron | | Palermo | 3400+ | 1 | No | 2000 | 800; HT | 64+64 | 128 | | Socket 939 | | MMX, 3DNow!+, SSE, SSE2, SSE3 | | AMD64, NX Bit | + SSE3: PowerNow!; + Cool'n'Quiet + AMD-V |
| K8 | 90 | Sempron | | Palermo | 3500+ | 1 | No | 2000 | 800; HT | 64+64 | 256 | | Socket 939 | | MMX, 3DNow!+, SSE, SSE2, SSE3 | | AMD64, NX Bit | + SSE3: PowerNow!; + Cool'n'Quiet + AMD-V |
| K8 | 90 | Sempron | | Manila | 2800+, 3200+, 3500+ | 1 | No | 1600, 1800, 2000 | 800; HT | 64+64 | 128 | | Socket AM2 | | MMX, 3DNow!+, SSE, SSE2, SSE3 | Cool'n'Quiet | AMD64, NX bit | + SSE3: PowerNow!; + Cool'n'Quiet + AMD-V |
| K8 | 90 | Sempron | | Manila | 3000+, 3400+, 3600+, 3800+ | 1 | No | 1600, 1800, 2000, 2200 | 800; HT | 64+64 | 256 | | Socket AM2 | | MMX, 3DNow!+, SSE, SSE2, SSE3 | Cool'n'Quiet | AMD64, NX bit | + SSE3: PowerNow!; + Cool'n'Quiet + AMD-V |
| K8 | 65 | Sempron | | Sparta | LE-1100, LE-1150 | 1 | No | 1900, 2000 | 800; HT | 64+64 | 256 | | Socket AM2 | | MMX, 3DNow!+, SSE, SSE2, SSE3 | Cool'n'Quiet | AMD64, NX bit | + SSE3: PowerNow!; + Cool'n'Quiet + AMD-V |
| K8 | 65 | Sempron | | Sparta | LE-1200, LE-1250, LE-1300 | 1 | No | 2100, 2200, 2300 | 800; HT | 64+64 | 512 | | Socket AM2 | | MMX, 3DNow!+, SSE, SSE2, SSE3 | Cool'n'Quiet | AMD64, NX bit | + SSE3: PowerNow!; + Cool'n'Quiet + AMD-V |
| K8 | 130 | Mobile Athlon 64 | | Clawhammer | 2700+ | 1 | No | 1600 | 800; HT | 64+64 | 512 | | Socket 754 | | MMX, 3DNow!+, SSE, SSE2 | | AMD64, NX bit | + SSE3: PowerNow!; + Cool'n'Quiet + AMD-V |
| K8 | 130 | Mobile Athlon 64 | | Clawhammer | 2800+, 3000+, 3200+, 3400+, 3700+ | 1 | No | 1600, 1800, 2000, 2200, 2400 | 800; HT | 64+64 | 1024 | | Socket 754 | | MMX, 3DNow!+, SSE, SSE2 | | AMD64, NX bit | + SSE3: PowerNow!; + Cool'n'Quiet + AMD-V |
| K8 | 130 | Mobile Athlon 64 | | Odessa | 2700+, 2800+, 3000+ | 1 | No | 1600, 1800, 2000 | 800; HT | 64+64 | 512 | | Socket 754 | | MMX, 3DNow!+, SSE, SSE2 | | AMD64, NX bit | + SSE3: PowerNow!; + Cool'n'Quiet + AMD-V |
| K8 | 90 | Mobile Athlon 64 | | Oakville | 2700+, 2800+, 3000+ | 1 | No | 1600, 1800, 2000 | 800; HT | 64+64 | 512 | | Socket 754 | | MMX, 3DNow!+, SSE, SSE2 | | AMD64, NX bit | + SSE3: PowerNow!; + Cool'n'Quiet + AMD-V |
| K8 | 90 | Mobile Athlon 64 | | Newark | 3000+, 3200+, 3400+, 3700+, 4000+ | 1 | No | 1800, 2000, 2200, 2400, 2600 | 800; HT | 64+64 | 1024 | | Socket 754 | | MMX, 3DNow!+, SSE, SSE2 | | AMD64, NX bit | + SSE3: PowerNow!; + Cool'n'Quiet + AMD-V |
| K8 | 130 | Mobile Sempron | | Dublin | | 1 | No | 1600, 1800 | 800; HT | 64+64 | 128 | | Socket 754 | | MMX, 3DNow!+, SSE, SSE2 | | AMD64, NX bit | + SSE3: PowerNow!; + Cool'n'Quiet + AMD-V |
| K8 | 130 | Mobile Sempron | | Dublin | | 1 | No | 1600 | 800; HT | 64+64 | 256 | | Socket 754 | | MMX, 3DNow!+, SSE, SSE2 | | AMD64, NX bit | + SSE3: PowerNow!; + Cool'n'Quiet + AMD-V |
| K8 | 90 | Mobile Sempron | | Georgetown | | 1 | No | 1600, 1800, 2000 | 800; HT | 64+64 | 128 | | Socket 754 | | MMX, 3DNow!+, SSE, SSE2 | | AMD64, NX bit | + SSE3: PowerNow!; + Cool'n'Quiet + AMD-V |
| K8 | 90 | Mobile Sempron | | Georgetown | | 1 | No | 1600, 1800 | 800; HT | 64+64 | 256 | | Socket 754 | | MMX, 3DNow!+, SSE, SSE2 | | AMD64, NX bit | + SSE3: PowerNow!; + Cool'n'Quiet + AMD-V |
| K8 | 90 | Mobile Sempron | | Sonora | | 1 | No | 1600, 1800 | 800; HT | 64+64 | 128 | | Socket 754 | | MMX, 3DNow!+, SSE, SSE2 | | AMD64, NX bit | + SSE3: PowerNow!; + Cool'n'Quiet + AMD-V |
| K8 | 90 | Mobile Sempron | | Sonora | | 1 | No | 1600, 1800 | 800; HT | 64+64 | 256 | | Socket 754 | | MMX, 3DNow!+, SSE, SSE2 | | AMD64, NX bit | + SSE3: PowerNow!; + Cool'n'Quiet + AMD-V |
| K8 | 90 | Mobile Sempron | | Albany | | 1 | No | 1800, 2000, 2200 | 800; HT | 64+64 | 128 | | Socket 754 | | MMX, 3DNow!+, SSE, SSE2, SSE3 | | AMD64, NX bit | + SSE3: PowerNow!; + Cool'n'Quiet + AMD-V |
| K8 | 90 | Mobile Sempron | | Albany | | 1 | No | 1800, 2000 | 800; HT | 64+64 | 256 | | Socket 754 | | MMX, 3DNow!+, SSE, SSE2, SSE3 | | AMD64, NX bit | + SSE3: PowerNow!; + Cool'n'Quiet + AMD-V |
| K8 | 90 | Mobile Sempron | | Roma | | 1 | No | 1800, 2000 | 800; HT | 64+64 | 128 | | Socket 754 | | MMX, 3DNow!+, SSE, SSE2, SSE3 | | AMD64, NX bit | + SSE3: PowerNow!; + Cool'n'Quiet + AMD-V |
| K8 | 90 | Mobile Sempron | | Roma | | 1 | No | 1600, 1800, 2000 | 800; HT | 64+64 | 256 | | Socket 754 | | MMX, 3DNow!+, SSE, SSE2, SSE3 | | AMD64, NX bit | + SSE3: PowerNow!; + Cool'n'Quiet + AMD-V |
| K8 | 90 | Mobile Sempron | | Keene | | 1 | No | 1800, 2000 | 800; HT | 64+64 | 256 | | Socket S1 | | MMX, 3DNow!+, SSE, SSE2, SSE3 | PowerNow! | AMD64, NX bit | + SSE3: PowerNow!; + Cool'n'Quiet + AMD-V |
| K8 | 90 | Mobile Sempron | | Keene | | 1 | No | 1600, 1800, 2000 | 800; HT | 64+64 | 512 | | Socket S1 | | MMX, 3DNow!+, SSE, SSE2, SSE3 | PowerNow! | AMD64, NX bit | + SSE3: PowerNow!; + Cool'n'Quiet + AMD-V |
| K8 | 90 | Turion 64 | | Lancaster | MT-28, MT-32, ML-42 | 1 | No | 1600 1800, 2400 | 800; HT | 64+64 | 512 | | Socket 754 | | MMX, 3DNow!+, SSE, SSE2, SSE3 | | AMD64, NX bit | + SSE3: PowerNow!; + Cool'n'Quiet + AMD-V |
| K8 | 90 | Turion 64 | | Lancaster | MT-30, MT-34, MT-37, MT-40, ML-44 | 1 | No | 1600, 1800, 2000, 2200, 2400 | 800; HT | 64+64 | 1024 | | Socket 754 | | MMX, 3DNow!+, SSE, SSE2, SSE3 | | AMD64, NX bit | + SSE3: PowerNow!; + Cool'n'Quiet + AMD-V |
| K8 | 90 | Turion 64 | | Richmond | MK-36, MK-38 | 1 | No | 2000, 2200 | 800; HT | 64+64 | 512 | | Socket 754 | | MMX, 3DNow!+, SSE, SSE2, SSE3 | | AMD64, NX bit | + SSE3: PowerNow!; + Cool'n'Quiet + AMD-V |
| K8 | 90 | Turion 64 X2 | | Taylor | TL-50 | 2 | No | 1600 | 800; HT | 64+64 | 256 | | Socket S1 | | MMX, 3DNow!+, SSE, SSE2, SSE3 | | AMD64; NX bit | + SSE3: PowerNow!; + Cool'n'Quiet + AMD-V |
| K8 | 90 | Turion 64 X2 | | Trinidad | TL-52, TL-56, TL-60, TL-64 | 2 | No | 1600, 1800, 2000, 2200 | 800; HT | 64+64 | 512 | | Socket S1 | | MMX, 3DNow!+, SSE, SSE2, SSE3 | | AMD64; NX bit | + SSE3: PowerNow!; + Cool'n'Quiet + AMD-V |
| K8 | 65 | Turion 64 X2 | | Tyler | TK-53, TK-55, TK-57 | 2 | No | 1700, 1800, 1900 | 800; HT | 64+64 | 256 | | Socket S1 | | MMX, 3DNow!+, SSE, SSE2, SSE3 | | AMD64; NX bit | + SSE3: PowerNow!; + Cool'n'Quiet + AMD-V |
| K8 | 65 | Turion 64 X2 | | Tyler | TL-56, TL-58, TL-60, TL-62, TL-64, TL-66, TL-68 | 2 | No | 1800, 1900, 2000, 2100, 2200, 2300, 2400 | 800; HT | 64+64 | 512 | | Socket S1 | | MMX, 3DNow!+, SSE, SSE2, SSE3 | | AMD64; NX bit | + SSE3: PowerNow!; + Cool'n'Quiet + AMD-V |
| K10 | 65 | Opteron | | Barcelona | | 4 | No | 1700–2500 | 1000; HT | 64+64 | 256, 512 | 2048 | Socket F | | MMX, SSE, SSE2, SSE3, SSE4a, Enhanced 3DNow! | PowerNow! | AMD64, NX bit, AMD-V, ccNUMA | + SSE4a + Enhanced 3DNow! |
| K10 | 65 | Opteron | | Budapest | | 4 | No | 1700–2500 | 1000; HT | 64+64 | 256, 512 | 2048 | Socket AM2 | | MMX, SSE, SSE2, SSE3, SSE4a, Enhanced 3DNow! | PowerNow! | AMD64, NX bit, AMD-V | + SSE4a + Enhanced 3DNow! |
| K10 | 65 | Phenom | | Agena | 9100e, 9150e, 9350e, 9450e, 9500, 9550, 9600, 9600B, 9600BE, 9650, 9670, 9750, 9750B, 9850, 9850B 9850BE, 9950BE | 4 | No | 1800–2600 | 1600, 1800, 2000; HT | 64+64 | 512 | 2048 | Socket AM2+ | | MMX, SSE, SSE2, SSE3, SSE4a, Enhanced 3DNow! | Cool'n'Quiet | AMD64, NX bit, AMD-V | + SSE4a + Enhanced 3DNow! |
| K10 | 65 | Phenom | | Toliman | 8250e, 8400, 8450, 8450e, 8550, 8600, 8600B, 8650, 8750, 8750B, 8750BE, 8850 | 3 | No | 1900–2500 | 1600, 1800; HT | 64+64 | 512 | 2048 | Socket AM2+ | | MMX, SSE, SSE2, SSE3, SSE4a, Enhanced 3DNow! | Cool'n'Quiet | AMD64, NX bit, AMD-V | + SSE4a + Enhanced 3DNow! |
| K10 | 65 | Athlon X2 | | Kuma | 6500BE | 2 | No | 2300 | 1600, 1800; HT | 64+64 | 1024 | | Socket AM2+ | | MMX, SSE, SSE2, SSE3, SSE4a, Enhanced 3DNow! | Cool'n'Quiet | AMD64, NX bit, AMD-V | + SSE4a + Enhanced 3DNow! |
| K10 | 65 | Athlon X2 | | Kuma | 7450, 7550, 7750BE, 7850BE | 2 | No | 2400–2800 | 1600, 1800; HT | 64+64 | 1024 | 2048 | Socket AM2+ | | MMX, SSE, SSE2, SSE3, SSE4a, Enhanced 3DNow! | Cool'n'Quiet | AMD64, NX bit, AMD-V | + SSE4a + Enhanced 3DNow! |
| K10 | 65 | Athlon | | Lima | | 1 | No | 2400–2700 | 1600, 1800; HT | 64+64 | 512, 1024 | | Socket AM2+ | | MMX, SSE, SSE2, SSE3, SSE4a, Enhanced 3DNow! | Cool'n'Quiet | AMD64, NX bit, AMD-V | + SSE4a + Enhanced 3DNow! |
| K10 | 65 | Sempron | | Sparta | | 1 | No | 2700 | 1600; HT | 64+64 | 512 | | Socket AM2+ | | MMX, SSE, SSE2, SSE3, SSE4a, Enhanced 3DNow! | Cool'n'Quiet | AMD64, NX bit, AMD-V | + SSE4a + Enhanced 3DNow! |
| K10.5 | 45 | Phenom II | | Thuban | 1045T, 1055T, 1075T, 1090T, 1100T | 6/6 | No | 2600–3300 | 1800, 2000; HT | 64+64 | 512 | 6144 | Socket AM2+ Socket AM3 | DDR2; DDR3 | MMX, SSE, SSE2, SSE3, SSE4a, Enhanced 3DNow! | Cool'n'Quiet | AMD64, NX bit, AMD-V | |
| K10.5 | 45 | Phenom II | | Zosma | 840T, 960T, 970^{(E0 stepping)} | 4/6 | No | 3000–3400 | 1800, 2000; HT | 64+64 | 512 | 6144 | Socket AM2+ Socket AM3 | DDR2; DDR3 | MMX, SSE, SSE2, SSE3, SSE4a, Enhanced 3DNow! | Cool'n'Quiet | AMD64, NX bit, AMD-V | |
| K10.5 | 45 | Phenom II | | Deneb | 805, 810, 820, 830, 905e, 910e, 920, 925, 940, 945, 955, 965, 970, 975, 980 | 4/4 | No | 2500–3700 | 1800, 2000; HT | 64+64 | 512 | 6144 (805–820 only 4096) | Socket AM2+ Socket AM3 | DDR2; DDR3 | MMX, SSE, SSE2, SSE3, SSE4a, Enhanced 3DNow! | Cool'n'Quiet | AMD64, NX bit, AMD-V | |
| K10.5 | 45 | Phenom II | | Heka | 705e, 720, 740 | 3/4 | No | 2500–2800 | 2000; HT | 64+64 | 512 | 6144 | Socket AM2+ Socket AM3 | DDR2; DDR3 | MMX, SSE, SSE2, SSE3, SSE4a, Enhanced 3DNow! | Cool'n'Quiet | AMD64, NX bit, AMD-V | |
| K10.5 | 45 | Phenom II | | Callisto | 545, 550, 555, 560, 565, 570 | 2/4 | No | 3000–3400 | 2000; HT | 64+64 | 512 | 6144 | Socket AM2+ Socket AM3 | DDR2; DDR3 | MMX, SSE, SSE2, SSE3, SSE4a, Enhanced 3DNow! | Cool'n'Quiet | AMD64, NX bit, AMD-V | |
| K10.5 | 45 | Athlon II | | Propus | | 4 | No | 2200–2800 | 2000; HT | 64+64 | 512 | | Socket AM2+ Socket AM3 | DDR2; DDR3 | MMX, SSE, SSE2, SSE3, SSE4a, Enhanced 3DNow! | Cool'n'Quiet | AMD64, NX bit, AMD-V | |
| K10.5 | 45 | Athlon II | | Rana | | 3 | No | 2200–3100 | 2000; HT | 64+64 | 512 | | Socket AM2+ Socket AM3 | DDR2; DDR3 | MMX, SSE, SSE2, SSE3, SSE4a, Enhanced 3DNow! | Cool'n'Quiet | AMD64, NX bit, AMD-V | |
| K10.5 | 45 | Athlon II | | Regor | | 2 | No | 1600–3600 | 2000; HT | 64+64 | 512, 1024 | | Socket AM2+ Socket AM3 | DDR2; DDR3 | MMX, SSE, SSE2, SSE3, SSE4a, Enhanced 3DNow! | Cool'n'Quiet | AMD64, NX bit, AMD-V | |
| K10.5 | 45 | Sempron | | Sargas | 130 | 1 | No | 2600 | 2000; HT | 64+64 | 512 | | Socket AM2+ Socket AM3 | DDR2; DDR3 | MMX, SSE, SSE2, SSE3, SSE4a, Enhanced 3DNow! | PowerNow! | AMD64, NX bit, AMD-V | |
| K10.5 | 45 | Sempron | | Sargas | 140 | 1 | No | 2700 | 2000; HT | 64+64 | 1024 | | Socket AM2+ Socket AM3 | DDR2; DDR3 | MMX, SSE, SSE2, SSE3, SSE4a, Enhanced 3DNow! | PowerNow! | AMD64, NX bit, AMD-V | |
| K10.5 | 45 | Sempron | | Sargas | 145 | 1 | No | 2800 | 2000; HT | 64+64 | 1024 | | Socket AM2+ Socket AM3 | DDR2; DDR3 | MMX, SSE, SSE2, SSE3, SSE4a, Enhanced 3DNow! | PowerNow! | AMD64, NX bit, AMD-V | |
| K10.5 | 45 | Sempron | | Sargas | 150 | 1 | No | 2900 | 2000; HT | 64+64 | 1024 | | Socket AM2+ Socket AM3 | DDR2; DDR3 | MMX, SSE, SSE2, SSE3, SSE4a, Enhanced 3DNow! | PowerNow! | AMD64, NX bit, AMD-V | |
| K10.5 | 45 | Turion II | | Caspian | | 2 | No | 2000–2700 | 1800, 1600; HT | 64+64 | 512, 1024 | | Socket S1G3 | DDR2 | MMX, SSE, SSE2, SSE3, SSE4a, Enhanced 3DNow! | PowerNow! | AMD64, NX bit, AMD-V | |
| K10.5 | 32 | Llano | | Llano | E2-3200, A4-3300, A4-3420, A6-3500, A6-3600, A6-3620, A6-3650, A6-3670K, A8-3800, A8-3820, A8-3850, A8-3870K | 2/3/4 | No | 2100–3000 | | 64+64 | 1024, 3072, 4096 | | Socket FM1 | DDR3 | MMX, SSE, SSE2, SSE3, SSE4a, Enhanced 3DNow! | PowerNow! | AMD64, NX bit, AMD-V | |
| Bobcat | 40 | Bobcat | | Desna, Ontario, Zacate | C-series, E-series, G-series, Z-series | 1/2 | No | 1000 – 1750 | | 32 + 32 | 512 KB (per core) | | Socket FT1 | DDR3 | MMX, SSE, SSE2, SSE3, SSE3s, SSE4a | PowerNow! | AMD64, NX bit, AMD-V | + SSE3s |
| Bulldozer | 32 | Bulldozer | October 2011 | Zambezi | FX-4100 series (4100, 4120, 4130, 4150, 4170) | 4 | CMT | 3600–4200 (3700–4300 boost) | 2600 MHz; HT | 64 KB inst. per module, 16 KB data per core | 2 MB per module | 4 MB (FX-4130), 8 MB (all other models) | Socket AM3+ | Dual-channel DDR3 | MMX, SSE, SSE2, SSE3, SSE3s, SSE4a, SSE4.1, SSE4.2, AVX | Cool'n'Quiet, PowerNow!, Turbo Core 2.0 | AMD64, NX bit, AMD-V, IOMMU, AES, CLMUL, XOP, FMA4, CVT16/F16C, ABM, ECC | + SSE4.1 + SSE4.2 + AVX + Turbo Core 2.0 + IOMMU + AES + CLMUL + FMA4 + XOP + CVT16 + F16C + ABM + ECC |
| Bulldozer | 32 | Bulldozer | October 2011 | Zambezi | FX-6100 series (6100, 6120, 6130, 6200) | 6 | CMT | 3300–3800 (3600–4200 boost) | 2600 MHz; HT | 64 KB inst. per module, 16 KB data per core | 2 MB per module | 8 MB | Socket AM3+ | Dual-channel DDR3 | MMX, SSE, SSE2, SSE3, SSE3s, SSE4a, SSE4.1, SSE4.2, AVX | Cool'n'Quiet, PowerNow!, Turbo Core 2.0 | AMD64, NX bit, AMD-V, IOMMU, AES, CLMUL, XOP, FMA4, CVT16/F16C, ABM, ECC | + SSE4.1 + SSE4.2 + AVX + Turbo Core 2.0 + IOMMU + AES + CLMUL + FMA4 + XOP + CVT16 + F16C + ABM + ECC |
| Bulldozer | 32 | Bulldozer | October 2011 | Zambezi | FX-8100 series (8100, 8120, 8140, 8150, 8170) | 8 | CMT | 2800–3900 (3100–4500 boost) | 2600 MHz; HT | 64 KB inst. per module, 16 KB data per core | 2 MB per module | 8 MB | Socket AM3+ | Dual-channel DDR3 | MMX, SSE, SSE2, SSE3, SSE3s, SSE4a, SSE4.1, SSE4.2, AVX | Cool'n'Quiet, PowerNow!, Turbo Core 2.0 | AMD64, NX bit, AMD-V, IOMMU, AES, CLMUL, XOP, FMA4, CVT16/F16C, ABM, ECC | + SSE4.1 + SSE4.2 + AVX + Turbo Core 2.0 + IOMMU + AES + CLMUL + FMA4 + XOP + CVT16 + F16C + ABM + ECC |
| Bulldozer | 32 | Bulldozer | March 2012 | Zurich | Opteron 3200 series (3250HE, 3260HE, 3280) | 4/8 | CMT | 2400–2700 (2700–3700 boost) | 2600 MHz; HT | 64 KB inst. per module, 16 KB data per core | 2 MB per module | 4 MB (3250HE, 3260HE), 8 MB (3280) | Socket AM3+ | Dual-channel DDR3 | MMX, SSE, SSE2, SSE3, SSE3s, SSE4a, SSE4.1, SSE4.2, AVX | Cool'n'Quiet, PowerNow!, Turbo Core 2.0 | AMD64, NX bit, AMD-V, IOMMU, AES, CLMUL, XOP, FMA4, CVT16/F16C, ABM, ECC | + SSE4.1 + SSE4.2 + AVX + Turbo Core 2.0 + IOMMU + AES + CLMUL + FMA4 + XOP + CVT16 + F16C + ABM + ECC |
| Bulldozer | 32 | Bulldozer | November 2011 | Valencia | Opteron 4200 series (42DX, 42MX, 4226, 4228HE, 4230HE, 4234, 4238, 4240, 4256EE,4274HE, 4276HE, 4280, 4284) | 4/6/8 | CMT | 1600–3400 (1900–3800 boost) | 3200 MHz; HT up to 2 links | 64 KB inst. per module, 16 KB data per core | 2 MB per module | 8 MB | Socket C32 | Dual-channel DDR3 | MMX, SSE, SSE2, SSE3, SSE3s, SSE4a, SSE4.1, SSE4.2, AVX | Cool'n'Quiet, PowerNow!, Turbo Core 2.0 | AMD64, NX bit, AMD-V, IOMMU, AES, CLMUL, XOP, FMA4, CVT16/F16C, ABM, ECC | + SSE4.1 + SSE4.2 + AVX + Turbo Core 2.0 + IOMMU + AES + CLMUL + FMA4 + XOP + CVT16 + F16C + ABM + ECC |
| Bulldozer | 32 | Bulldozer | November 2011 | Interlagos | Opteron 6200 series (6204, 6212, 6220, 6230HE, 6234, 6238, 6262HE, 6272, 6274, 6276, 6278, 6282SE, 6284SE) | 4/8/12/16 | CMT | 1600–3300 (2100–3600 boost) | 3200 MHz; HT up to 4 links | 64 KB inst. per module, 16 KB data per core | 2 MB per module | 16 MB (8 MB per chiplet) | Socket G34 | Quad-channel DDR3 | MMX, SSE, SSE2, SSE3, SSE3s, SSE4a, SSE4.1, SSE4.2, AVX | Cool'n'Quiet, PowerNow!, Turbo Core 2.0 | AMD64, NX bit, AMD-V, IOMMU, AES, CLMUL, XOP, FMA4, CVT16/F16C, ABM, ECC | + SSE4.1 + SSE4.2 + AVX + Turbo Core 2.0 + IOMMU + AES + CLMUL + FMA4 + XOP + CVT16 + F16C + ABM + ECC |
| Bulldozer | 32 | Piledriver | | Trinity | SempronX2 240, AthlonX2 340, AthlonX4 740, AthlonX4 750K, FirePro A300, FirePro A320, A4-4300M, A4-4355M, A4-5300, A4-5300B, A6-4400M, A6-4455M, A6-5400K, A6-5400B, A8-5500, A8-4500M, A8-4555M, A8-5500B, A8-5600K, A10-4600M, A10-4655M, A10-5700, A10-5800K, A10-5800B | 2/4 | CMT | 1600–3800 (2400–4200 boost) | | 64 KB inst. per module, 16 KB data per core | 2x2, 1 | none | Socket FM2; FS1r2; FP2 | DDR3 | MMX, SSE, SSE2, SSE3, SSE3s, SSE4a, SSE4.1, SSE4.2, AVX | Cool'n'Quiet, PowerNow!, Turbo Core 3.0 | AMD64, NX bit, AMD-V, IOMMU, AES, CLMUL, XOP, FMA3, FMA4, CVT16/F16C, ABM, BMI1, TBM, ECC, EVP. | + Turbo Core 3.0 + FMA3 + BMI1 + TBM + EVP |
| Bulldozer | 32 | Piledriver | | Richland | SempronX2 250, AthlonX2 350, AthlonX2 370K, AthlonX2 750, AthlonX2 760K, FX-670K, A4-4000, A4-4320, A4-5145M, A4-5150M, A4-6300, A4-6300B, A4-6320, A4-6320B, A4-7300, A4PRO-7300B, A6-5345M, A6-5350M, A6-5357M, A6-6400B, A6-6400K, A6-6420B, A6-6420K, A8-5345M, A8-5350M, A8-5357M, A8-6500, A8-6500T, A8-6500B, A8-6600, A10-5745M, A10-5750M, A10-5757M, A10-6700, A10-6700T, A10-6790B, A10-6790K, A10-6800B, A10-6800K | 2/4 | CMT | 1700–4100 (2600–4400 boost) | | 64 KB inst. per module, 16 KB data per core | 2x2, 1 | none | Socket FM2; FS1r2; FP2 | DDR3 | MMX, SSE, SSE2, SSE3, SSE3s, SSE4a, SSE4.1, SSE4.2, AVX | Cool'n'Quiet, PowerNow!, Turbo Core 3.0 | AMD64, NX bit, AMD-V, IOMMU, AES, CLMUL, XOP, FMA3, FMA4, CVT16/F16C, ABM, BMI1, TBM, ECC, EVP. | + Turbo Core 3.0 + FMA3 + BMI1 + TBM + EVP |
| Bulldozer | 32 | Piledriver | October 2012 | Vishera | FX-4300 series (4300, 4320, 4350) | 4 | CMT | 3800–4200 (4000–4300 boost) | 2600 MHz; HT | 64 KB inst. per module, 16 KB data per core | 2 MB per module | 4 MB (FX-4300, FX-4320), 8 MB (FX-4350) | Socket AM3+ | Dual-channel DDR3 | MMX, SSE, SSE2, SSE3, SSE3s, SSE4a, SSE4.1, SSE4.2, AVX | Cool'n'Quiet, PowerNow!, Turbo Core 3.0 | AMD64, NX bit, AMD-V, IOMMU, AES, CLMUL, XOP, FMA3, FMA4, CVT16/F16C, ABM, BMI1, TBM, ECC, EVP. | + Turbo Core 3.0 + FMA3 + BMI1 + TBM + EVP |
| Bulldozer | 32 | Piledriver | October 2012 | Vishera | FX-6300 series (6300, 6350) | 6 | CMT | 3500–3900 (4100–4200 boost) | 2600 MHz; HT | 64 KB inst. per module, 16 KB data per core | 2 MB per module | 8 MB | Socket AM3+ | Dual-channel DDR3 | MMX, SSE, SSE2, SSE3, SSE3s, SSE4a, SSE4.1, SSE4.2, AVX | Cool'n'Quiet, PowerNow!, Turbo Core 3.0 | AMD64, NX bit, AMD-V, IOMMU, AES, CLMUL, XOP, FMA3, FMA4, CVT16/F16C, ABM, BMI1, TBM, ECC, EVP. | + Turbo Core 3.0 + FMA3 + BMI1 + TBM + EVP |
| Bulldozer | 32 | Piledriver | October 2012 | Vishera | FX-8300 series (8300, 8310, 8320, 8320E, 8350, 8370, 8370E, 9370, 9590) | 8 | CMT | 3300–4700 (4000–5000 boost) | 2600 MHz; HT | 64 KB inst. per module, 16 KB data per core | 2 MB per module | 8 MB | Socket AM3+ | Dual-channel DDR3 | MMX, SSE, SSE2, SSE3, SSE3s, SSE4a, SSE4.1, SSE4.2, AVX | Cool'n'Quiet, PowerNow!, Turbo Core 3.0 | AMD64, NX bit, AMD-V, IOMMU, AES, CLMUL, XOP, FMA3, FMA4, CVT16/F16C, ABM, BMI1, TBM, ECC, EVP. | + Turbo Core 3.0 + FMA3 + BMI1 + TBM + EVP |
| Bulldozer | 32 | Piledriver | December 2012 | Delhi | Opteron 3300 series (3320EE, 3350HE, 3365, 3380) | 4/8 | CMT | 1900–2800 (2100–3800 boost) | 2600 MHz; HT | 64 KB inst. per module, 16 KB data per core | 2 MB per module | 8 MB (all models) | Socket AM3+ | Dual-channel DDR3 | MMX, SSE, SSE2, SSE3, SSE3s, SSE4a, SSE4.1, SSE4.2, AVX | Cool'n'Quiet, PowerNow!, Turbo Core 3.0 | AMD64, NX bit, AMD-V, IOMMU, AES, CLMUL, XOP, FMA3, FMA4, CVT16/F16C, ABM, BMI1, TBM, ECC, EVP. | + Turbo Core 3.0 + FMA3 + BMI1 + TBM + EVP |
| Bulldozer | 32 | Piledriver | December 2012 | Seoul | Opteron 4300 series (43CXEE, 43GKHE, 4310EE, 4332HE, 4334, 4340, 4365EE, 4376HE, 4386) | 4/6/8 | CMT | 2000–3500 (2300–3800 boost) | 3200 MHz; HT up to 2 links | 64 KB inst. per module, 16 KB data per core | 2 MB per module | 8 MB (all models) | Socket C32 | Dual-channel DDR3 | MMX, SSE, SSE2, SSE3, SSE3s, SSE4a, SSE4.1, SSE4.2, AVX | Cool'n'Quiet, PowerNow!, Turbo Core 3.0 | AMD64, NX bit, AMD-V, IOMMU, AES, CLMUL, XOP, FMA3, FMA4, CVT16/F16C, ABM, BMI1, TBM, ECC, EVP. | + Turbo Core 3.0 + FMA3 + BMI1 + TBM + EVP |
| Bulldozer | 32 | Piledriver | November 2012 | Abu Dhabi | Opteron 6300 series (6308, 6320, 6328, 6338P, 6344, 6348, 6366HE, 6370P, 6376, 6378, 6380, 6386SE) | 4/8/12/16 | CMT | 1800–3500 (2300–3800 boost) | 3200 MHz; HT up to 4 links | 64 KB inst. per module, 16 KB data per core | 2 MB per module | 16 MB (8 MB per chiplet) | Socket G34 | Quad-channel DDR3 | MMX, SSE, SSE2, SSE3, SSE3s, SSE4a, SSE4.1, SSE4.2, AVX | Cool'n'Quiet, PowerNow!, Turbo Core 3.0 | AMD64, NX bit, AMD-V, IOMMU, AES, CLMUL, XOP, FMA3, FMA4, CVT16/F16C, ABM, BMI1, TBM, ECC, EVP. | + Turbo Core 3.0 + FMA3 + BMI1 + TBM + EVP |
| Bulldozer | 28 | Steamroller | | Kaveri | AthlonX2 450, AthlonX4 840, AthlonX4 860K, AthlonX4 870K, AthlonX4 880K, FX-770K, FX-7500, FX-7600P, A4PRO-7350B, A6-7000, A6Pro-7050B, A6-7400K, A6PRO-7400B, A6-7470K, A8-7100, A8Pro-7150B, A8-7200P, A8-7600, A8PRO-7600B, A8-7650K, A8-7670K, A10-7300, A10Pro-7350B, A10-7400P, A10-7700K, A10-7800, A10PRO-7800B, A10-7850K, A10-7850B, A10-7860K, A10-7870K, A10-7890K | 2/4 | CMT | 1800–4100 (3000–4300 boost) | | 96 KB inst. per module, 16 KB data per core | 2x2, 1 | none | Socket FM2+ Socket FP3 | DDR3 | MMX, SSE, SSE2, SSE3, SSE3s, SSE4a, SSE4.1, SSE4.2, AVX | Cool'n'Quiet, PowerNow!, Turbo Core 3.0 | AMD64, NX bit, AMD-V, IOMMU, AES, CLMUL, XOP, FMA3, FMA4, CVT16/F16C, ABM, BMI1, TBM, ECC, EVP. | + Turbo Core 3.0 + FMA3 + BMI1 + TBM + EVP |
| Bulldozer | 28 | Excavator | | Carrizo | AthlonX4 835, AthlonX4 845, FX-8800P, A6-8500P, A6Pro-8500B, A8-8600P, A8Pro-8600B, A10-8700P, A10Pro-8700B, A10-8780P, A12Pro-8800B | 2/4 | CMT | 1600–3500 (3000–3800 boost) | | 96 KB inst. per module, 32 KB data per core | 1 MB per module | none | Socket FM2+ Socket FP4 | DDR3 | MMX, SSE, SSE2, SSE3, SSE3s, SSE4a, SSE4.1, SSE4.2, AVX, AVX2 | Cool'n'Quiet, PowerNow!, Turbo Core 3.0 | AMD64, NX bit, AMD-V, IOMMU, AES, CLMUL, XOP, FMA3, FMA4, CVT16/F16C, ABM, BMI1, BMI2, TBM, ECC, EVP. | + AVX2 + BMI2 |
| Bulldozer | 28 | Excavator | | Bristol Ridge | AthlonX4 940, AthlonX4 950, AthlonX4 970, FX-9800P, FX-9830P, A6-9500, A6PRO-9500, A6Pro-9500B, A6-9500E, A6PRO-9500E, A6-9550, A8-9600, A8PRO-9600, A8Pro-9600B, A8Pro-9630B, A10-9600P, A10-9620P, A10-9630P, A10-9700, A10PRO-9700, A10Pro-9700B, A10-9700E, A10PRO-9700E, A10Pro-9730B, A12-9700P, A12-9720P, A12-9730P, A12-9800, A12PRO-9800, A12Pro-9800B, A12-9800E, A12PRO-9800E, A12Pro-9830B | 2/4 | CMT | 2300–3800 (3200–4200 boost) | | 96 KB inst. per module, 32 KB data per core | 1 MB per module | none | Socket AM4 Socket FP4 | DDR4 | MMX, SSE, SSE2, SSE3, SSE3s, SSE4a, SSE4.1, SSE4.2, AVX, AVX2 | Cool'n'Quiet, PowerNow!, Turbo Core 3.0 | AMD64, NX bit, AMD-V, IOMMU, AES, CLMUL, XOP, FMA3, FMA4, CVT16/F16C, ABM, BMI1, BMI2, TBM, ECC, EVP. | + AVX2 + BMI2 |
| Jaguar | 28 | Jaguar | | Kabini, Temash, Kyoto | | 2/4 | No | 1000–2200 | — | 32 KB inst. 32 KB data per core | 512 KB per core | —N/a | Desktop: Socket AM1, Mobile: Socket FT3 | DDR3 | MMX, SSE, SSE2, SSE3, SSE3s, SSE4a, SSE4.1, SSE4.2, AVX | PowerNow! | AMD64, NX bit, AMD-V, AES, CLMUL, CVT16/F16C, BMI1 | |
| Jaguar | 28 | Puma | | Beema, Mullins, Stepped Eagle, Crowned Eagle, Carrizo-L, LX-Family, | E1-6010, E1-6050, E1-6200T, E1-7010, E2-6110, E2-7110, A4-6210, A4-7210, A4Pro-3350B, A4-6400T, A6-6310, A6-7310, A8-6410, A8-7410 | 2/4 | No | 800–2400 | — | 32 KB inst. 32 KB data per core | 512 KB per core | —N/a | Socket FT3b, Socket AM1 | DDR3 | MMX, SSE, SSE2, SSE3, SSE3s, SSE4a, SSE4.1, SSE4.2, AVX | PowerNow! | AMD64, NX bit, AMD-V, AES, CLMUL, CVT16/F16C, BMI1 | |
| Zen | 14 GloFo 14LP | Zen | March 2017 | Summit Ridge | Ryzen 3 (Pro 1200, 1200, Pro 1300, 1300X) | 4 | No | 3100–3500 (3400–3700 boost) | 8.0 GT/s; PCIe | 64 KB inst. 32 KB data per core | 512 KB per core | 8 MB | Socket AM4 | Dual-channel DDR4 | MMX, SSE, SSE2, SSE3, SSE3s, SSE4a, SSE4.1, SSE4.2, AVX, AVX2 | | AMD64, AES, CLMUL, FMA3, CVT16/F16C, ABM, BMI1, BMI2, SHA | + SHA: FMA4; TBM; XOP; 3DNow; 3DNow!+; Enhanced 3DNow! |
| Zen | 14 GloFo 14LP | Zen | March 2017 | Summit Ridge | Ryzen 5 (1400, Pro 1500, 1500X, Pro 1600, 1600, 1600X) | 4/6 | Yes | 3200–3600 (3400–4000 boost) | 8.0 GT/s; PCIe | 64 KB inst. 32 KB data per core | 512 KB per core | 8–16 MB | Socket AM4 | Dual-channel DDR4 | MMX, SSE, SSE2, SSE3, SSE3s, SSE4a, SSE4.1, SSE4.2, AVX, AVX2 | | AMD64, AES, CLMUL, FMA3, CVT16/F16C, ABM, BMI1, BMI2, SHA | + SHA: FMA4; TBM; XOP; 3DNow; 3DNow!+; Enhanced 3DNow! |
| Zen | 14 GloFo 14LP | Zen | March 2017 | Summit Ridge | Ryzen 7 (Pro 1700, 1700, Pro 1700X, 1700X, 1800X) | 8 | Yes | 3000–3600 (3700–4000 boost) | 8.0 GT/s; PCIe | 64 KB inst. 32 KB data per core | 512 KB per core | 16 MB | Socket AM4 | Dual-channel DDR4 | MMX, SSE, SSE2, SSE3, SSE3s, SSE4a, SSE4.1, SSE4.2, AVX, AVX2 | | AMD64, AES, CLMUL, FMA3, CVT16/F16C, ABM, BMI1, BMI2, SHA | + SHA: FMA4; TBM; XOP; 3DNow; 3DNow!+; Enhanced 3DNow! |
| Zen | 14 GloFo 14LP | Zen | June 2017 | Naples | EPYC 7001 series | 8/16/24/32 | Yes | 2000–3100 (2550–3600 all) (2700–3800 boost) | 8.0 GT/s; PCIe | 64 KB inst. 32 KB data per core | 512 KB per core | 32–64 MB | Socket SP3 | Octa-channel DDR4 | MMX, SSE, SSE2, SSE3, SSE3s, SSE4a, SSE4.1, SSE4.2, AVX, AVX2 | | AMD64, AES, CLMUL, FMA3, CVT16/F16C, ABM, BMI1, BMI2, SHA | + SHA: FMA4; TBM; XOP; 3DNow; 3DNow!+; Enhanced 3DNow! |
| Zen | 14 GloFo 14LP | Zen | August 2017 | Whitehaven | Ryzen Threadripper (1900X, 1920X, 1950X) | 8/12/16 | Yes | 3200–3800 (3800–4000 boost) | 8.0 GT/s; PCIe | 64 KB inst. 32 KB data per core | 512 KB per core | 16–32 MB | Socket TR4 | Quad-channel DDR4 | MMX, SSE, SSE2, SSE3, SSE3s, SSE4a, SSE4.1, SSE4.2, AVX, AVX2 | | AMD64, AES, CLMUL, FMA3, CVT16/F16C, ABM, BMI1, BMI2, SHA | + SHA: FMA4; TBM; XOP; 3DNow; 3DNow!+; Enhanced 3DNow! |
| Zen | 14 GloFo 14LP | Zen | October 2017 | Raven Ridge | Athlon (Pro 200U, 300U), Ryzen 3 (2200U, 3200U, 3250U) | 2 | Yes | 2300–2600 (3200–3500 boost) | 8.0 GT/s; PCIe | 64 KB inst. 32 KB data per core | 512 KB per core | 4 MB | Socket FP5 | Dual-channel DDR4 | MMX, SSE, SSE2, SSE3, SSE3s, SSE4a, SSE4.1, SSE4.2, AVX, AVX2 | | AMD64, AES, CLMUL, FMA3, CVT16/F16C, ABM, BMI1, BMI2, SHA | + SHA: FMA4; TBM; XOP; 3DNow; 3DNow!+; Enhanced 3DNow! |
| Zen | 14 GloFo 14LP | Zen | October 2017 | Raven Ridge | Ryzen 3 (2300U, Pro 2300U) | 4 | No | 2000 (3400 boost) | 8.0 GT/s; PCIe | 64 KB inst. 32 KB data per core | 512 KB per core | 4 MB | Socket FP5 | Dual-channel DDR4 | MMX, SSE, SSE2, SSE3, SSE3s, SSE4a, SSE4.1, SSE4.2, AVX, AVX2 | | AMD64, AES, CLMUL, FMA3, CVT16/F16C, ABM, BMI1, BMI2, SHA | + SHA: FMA4; TBM; XOP; 3DNow; 3DNow!+; Enhanced 3DNow! |
| Zen | 14 GloFo 14LP | Zen | October 2017 | Raven Ridge | Ryzen 5 (2500U, Pro 2500U, 2600H), Ryzen 7 (2700U, Pro 2700U, 2800H) | 4 | Yes | 2000–3300 (3600–3800 boost) | 8.0 GT/s; PCIe | 64 KB inst. 32 KB data per core | 512 KB per core | 4 MB | Socket FP5 | Dual-channel DDR4 | MMX, SSE, SSE2, SSE3, SSE3s, SSE4a, SSE4.1, SSE4.2, AVX, AVX2 | | AMD64, AES, CLMUL, FMA3, CVT16/F16C, ABM, BMI1, BMI2, SHA | + SHA: FMA4; TBM; XOP; 3DNow; 3DNow!+; Enhanced 3DNow! |
| Zen | 14 GloFo 14LP | Zen | February 2018 | Raven Ridge | Athlon (200GE, Pro 200GE, 220GE, 240GE, 3000G) | 2 | Yes | 3200–3500 | 8.0 GT/s; PCIe | 64 KB inst. 32 KB data per core | 512 KB per core | 4 MB | Socket AM4 | Dual-channel DDR4 | MMX, SSE, SSE2, SSE3, SSE3s, SSE4a, SSE4.1, SSE4.2, AVX, AVX2 | | AMD64, AES, CLMUL, FMA3, CVT16/F16C, ABM, BMI1, BMI2, SHA | + SHA: FMA4; TBM; XOP; 3DNow; 3DNow!+; Enhanced 3DNow! |
| Zen | 14 GloFo 14LP | Zen | February 2018 | Raven Ridge | Ryzen 3 (2200GE, Pro 2200GE, 2200G, Pro 2200G) | 4 | No | 3200–3500 (3600–3700 boost) | 8.0 GT/s; PCIe | 64 KB inst. 32 KB data per core | 512 KB per core | 4 MB | Socket AM4 | Dual-channel DDR4 | MMX, SSE, SSE2, SSE3, SSE3s, SSE4a, SSE4.1, SSE4.2, AVX, AVX2 | | AMD64, AES, CLMUL, FMA3, CVT16/F16C, ABM, BMI1, BMI2, SHA | + SHA: FMA4; TBM; XOP; 3DNow; 3DNow!+; Enhanced 3DNow! |
| Zen | 14 GloFo 14LP | Zen | February 2018 | Raven Ridge | Ryzen 5 (2400GE, Pro 2400GE, 2400G, Pro 2400G) | 4 | Yes | 3200–3600 (3800–3900 boost) | 8.0 GT/s; PCIe | 64 KB inst. 32 KB data per core | 512 KB per core | 4 MB | Socket AM4 | Dual-channel DDR4 | MMX, SSE, SSE2, SSE3, SSE3s, SSE4a, SSE4.1, SSE4.2, AVX, AVX2 | | AMD64, AES, CLMUL, FMA3, CVT16/F16C, ABM, BMI1, BMI2, SHA | + SHA: FMA4; TBM; XOP; 3DNow; 3DNow!+; Enhanced 3DNow! |
| Zen | 14 GloFo 14LP | Zen | February 2018 | Snowy Owl | EPYC Embedded 3001 series | 4/8/12/16 | No | 1500–2100 (2150–3100 all) (2900–3100 boost) | 8.0 GT/s; PCIe | 64 KB inst. 32 KB data per core | 512 KB per core | 8–32 MB (8 MB per CCX) | Socket SP4r2 | Dual-channel DDR4 | MMX, SSE, SSE2, SSE3, SSE3s, SSE4a, SSE4.1, SSE4.2, AVX, AVX2 | | AMD64, AES, CLMUL, FMA3, CVT16/F16C, ABM, BMI1, BMI2, SHA | + SHA: FMA4; TBM; XOP; 3DNow; 3DNow!+; Enhanced 3DNow! |
| Zen | 14 GloFo 14LP | Zen | February 2018 | Snowy Owl | EPYC Embedded 3051 series | 4/8/12/16 | Yes | 1900–2700 (2450–3100 all) (2900–3100 boost) | 8.0 GT/s; PCIe | 64 KB inst. 32 KB data per core | 512 KB per core | 16–32 MB (8 MB per CCX) | Socket SP4r2 | Dual-channel DDR4 | MMX, SSE, SSE2, SSE3, SSE3s, SSE4a, SSE4.1, SSE4.2, AVX, AVX2 | | AMD64, AES, CLMUL, FMA3, CVT16/F16C, ABM, BMI1, BMI2, SHA | + SHA: FMA4; TBM; XOP; 3DNow; 3DNow!+; Enhanced 3DNow! |
| Zen | 14 GloFo 14LP | Zen | February 2018 | Great Horned Owl | Ryzen Embedded V1000 series | 2/4 | Yes | 2000–3350 (3200–3800 boost) | 8.0 GT/s; PCIe | 64 KB inst. 32 KB data per core | 512 KB per core | 4 MB | Socket FP5 | Dual-channel DDR4 | MMX, SSE, SSE2, SSE3, SSE3s, SSE4a, SSE4.1, SSE4.2, AVX, AVX2 | | AMD64, AES, CLMUL, FMA3, CVT16/F16C, ABM, BMI1, BMI2, SHA | + SHA: FMA4; TBM; XOP; 3DNow; 3DNow!+; Enhanced 3DNow! |
| Zen | 14 GloFo 14LP | Zen | April 2019 | Banded Kestrel | Ryzen Embedded R1000 series | 2 | No | 1200 (2600 boost) | 8.0 GT/s; PCIe | 64 KB inst. 32 KB data per core | 512 KB per core | 4 MB | Socket FP5 | Single-channel DDR4 | MMX, SSE, SSE2, SSE3, SSE3s, SSE4a, SSE4.1, SSE4.2, AVX, AVX2 | | AMD64, AES, CLMUL, FMA3, CVT16/F16C, ABM, BMI1, BMI2, SHA | + SHA: FMA4; TBM; XOP; 3DNow; 3DNow!+; Enhanced 3DNow! |
| Zen | 14 GloFo 14LP | Zen | April 2019 | Banded Kestrel | Ryzen Embedded R1000 series | 2 | Yes | 1500–2600 (2800–3500 boost) | 8.0 GT/s; PCIe | 64 KB inst. 32 KB data per core | 512 KB per core | 4 MB | Socket FP5 | Dual-channel DDR4 | MMX, SSE, SSE2, SSE3, SSE3s, SSE4a, SSE4.1, SSE4.2, AVX, AVX2 | | AMD64, AES, CLMUL, FMA3, CVT16/F16C, ABM, BMI1, BMI2, SHA | + SHA: FMA4; TBM; XOP; 3DNow; 3DNow!+; Enhanced 3DNow! |
| Zen | 12 GloFo 12LP | Zen+ | April 2018 | Pinnacle Ridge | Ryzen 3 (1200 AF, 2300X) | 4 | No | 3100–3500 (3400–4000 boost) | 8.0 GT/s; PCIe | 64 KB inst. 32 KB data per core | 512 KB per core | 8 MB | Socket AM4 | Dual-channel DDR4 | MMX, SSE, SSE2, SSE3, SSE3s, SSE4a, SSE4.1, SSE4.2, AVX, AVX2 | | AMD64, AES, CLMUL, FMA3, CVT16/F16C, ABM, BMI1, BMI2, SHA | |
| Zen | 12 GloFo 12LP | Zen+ | April 2018 | Pinnacle Ridge | Ryzen 5 2500X | 4 | Yes | 3600 (4000 boost) | 8.0 GT/s; PCIe | 64 KB inst. 32 KB data per core | 512 KB per core | 8 MB | Socket AM4 | Dual-channel DDR4 | MMX, SSE, SSE2, SSE3, SSE3s, SSE4a, SSE4.1, SSE4.2, AVX, AVX2 | | AMD64, AES, CLMUL, FMA3, CVT16/F16C, ABM, BMI1, BMI2, SHA | |
| Zen | 12 GloFo 12LP | Zen+ | April 2018 | Pinnacle Ridge | Ryzen 5 (1600 AF, 2600, 2600E, 2600X), Ryzen 7 (2700, 2700E, 2700X, Pro 2700X) | 6/8 | Yes | 2800–3700 (3600–4300 boost) | 8.0 GT/s; PCIe | 64 KB inst. 32 KB data per core | 512 KB per core | 16 MB | Socket AM4 | Dual-channel DDR4 | MMX, SSE, SSE2, SSE3, SSE3s, SSE4a, SSE4.1, SSE4.2, AVX, AVX2 | | AMD64, AES, CLMUL, FMA3, CVT16/F16C, ABM, BMI1, BMI2, SHA | |
| Zen | 12 GloFo 12LP | Zen+ | August 2018 | Colfax | Ryzen Threadripper (2920X, 2950X, 2970WX, 2990WX) | 12/16/24/32 | Yes | 3000–3500 (4200–4400 boost) | 8.0 GT/s; PCIe | 64 KB inst. 32 KB data per core | 512 KB per core | 32–64 MB | Socket TR4 | Quad-channel DDR4 | MMX, SSE, SSE2, SSE3, SSE3s, SSE4a, SSE4.1, SSE4.2, AVX, AVX2 | | AMD64, AES, CLMUL, FMA3, CVT16/F16C, ABM, BMI1, BMI2, SHA | |
| Zen | 12 GloFo 12LP | Zen+ | January 2019 | Picasso | Ryzen 3 (3300U, Pro 3300U, 3350U) | 4 | No | 2100 (3500 boost) | 8.0 GT/s; PCIe | 64 KB inst. 32 KB data per core | 512 KB per core | 4 MB | Socket FP5 | Dual-channel DDR4 | MMX, SSE, SSE2, SSE3, SSE3s, SSE4a, SSE4.1, SSE4.2, AVX, AVX2 | | AMD64, AES, CLMUL, FMA3, CVT16/F16C, ABM, BMI1, BMI2, SHA | |
| Zen | 12 GloFo 12LP | Zen+ | January 2019 | Picasso | Ryzen 5 (3450U, 3500C, 3500U, Pro 3500U, 3550H, 3580U), Ryzen 7 (3700C, 3700U, Pro 3700U, 3750H, 3780U) | 4 | Yes | 2100–2300 (3500–4000 boost) | 8.0 GT/s; PCIe | 64 KB inst. 32 KB data per core | 512 KB per core | 4 MB | Socket FP5 | Dual-channel DDR4 | MMX, SSE, SSE2, SSE3, SSE3s, SSE4a, SSE4.1, SSE4.2, AVX, AVX2 | | AMD64, AES, CLMUL, FMA3, CVT16/F16C, ABM, BMI1, BMI2, SHA | |
| Zen | 12 GloFo 12LP | Zen+ | July 2019 | Picasso | Ryzen 3 (3200GE, Pro 3200GE, 3200G, Pro 3200G) | 4 | No | 3300–3600 (3800–4000 boost) | 8.0 GT/s; PCIe | 64 KB inst. 32 KB data per core | 512 KB per core | 4 MB | Socket AM4 | Dual-channel DDR4 | MMX, SSE, SSE2, SSE3, SSE3s, SSE4a, SSE4.1, SSE4.2, AVX, AVX2 | | AMD64, AES, CLMUL, FMA3, CVT16/F16C, ABM, BMI1, BMI2, SHA | |
| Zen | 12 GloFo 12LP | Zen+ | July 2019 | Picasso | Ryzen 5 (3400GE, Pro 3400GE, 3400G, Pro 3400G) | 4 | Yes | 3300–3700 (4000–4200 boost) | 8.0 GT/s; PCIe | 64 KB inst. 32 KB data per core | 512 KB per core | 4 MB | Socket AM4 | Dual-channel DDR4 | MMX, SSE, SSE2, SSE3, SSE3s, SSE4a, SSE4.1, SSE4.2, AVX, AVX2 | | AMD64, AES, CLMUL, FMA3, CVT16/F16C, ABM, BMI1, BMI2, SHA | |
| Zen | 12 GloFo 12LP | Zen+ | July 2020 | Dali | Athlon Silver 3050GE; Athlon Silver PRO 3125GE | 2 | Yes | 3400 | 8.0 GT/s; PCIe | 64 KB inst. 32 KB data per core | 512 KB per core | 4 MB | Socket AM4 | Dual-channel DDR4 | MMX, SSE, SSE2, SSE3, SSE3s, SSE4a, SSE4.1, SSE4.2, AVX, AVX2 | | AMD64, AES, CLMUL, FMA3, CVT16/F16C, ABM, BMI1, BMI2, SHA | |
| Zen | 12 GloFo 12LP | Zen+ | July 2020 | Dali | Athlon Gold (3150G, 3150GE); Athlon Gold PRO (3150G, 3150GE) | 4 | No | 3500 (3800–3900 boost) | 8.0 GT/s; PCIe | 64 KB inst. 32 KB data per core | 512 KB per core | 4 MB | Socket AM4 | Dual-channel DDR4 | MMX, SSE, SSE2, SSE3, SSE3s, SSE4a, SSE4.1, SSE4.2, AVX, AVX2 | | AMD64, AES, CLMUL, FMA3, CVT16/F16C, ABM, BMI1, BMI2, SHA | |
| Zen | 7 TSMC N7 | Zen 2 | July 2019 | Matisse | Ryzen 3 (3100, 3300X) | 4 | Yes | 3600–3800 (3900–4200 boost) | 16.0 GT/s; PCIe | 32 KB inst. 32 KB data per core | 512 KB per core | 16 MB | Socket AM4 | Dual-channel DDR4 | MMX, SSE, SSE2, SSE3, SSE3s, SSE4a, SSE4.1, SSE4.2, AVX, AVX2 | | AMD64, AES, CLMUL, FMA3, CVT16/F16C, ABM, BMI1, BMI2, SHA | |
| Zen | 7 TSMC N7 | Zen 2 | July 2019 | Matisse | Ryzen 5 (3500, 3500X) | 6 | No | 3600 (4100 boost) | 16.0 GT/s; PCIe | 32 KB inst. 32 KB data per core | 512 KB per core | 16–32 MB | Socket AM4 | Dual-channel DDR4 | MMX, SSE, SSE2, SSE3, SSE3s, SSE4a, SSE4.1, SSE4.2, AVX, AVX2 | | AMD64, AES, CLMUL, FMA3, CVT16/F16C, ABM, BMI1, BMI2, SHA | |
| Zen | 7 TSMC N7 | Zen 2 | July 2019 | Matisse | Ryzen 5 (3600, Pro 3600, 3600X, 3600XT), Ryzen 7 (Pro 3700, 3700X, 3800X, 3800XT) | 6/8 | Yes | 3600–3900 (4200–4700 boost) | 16.0 GT/s; PCIe | 32 KB inst. 32 KB data per core | 512 KB per core | 32 MB | Socket AM4 | Dual-channel DDR4 | MMX, SSE, SSE2, SSE3, SSE3s, SSE4a, SSE4.1, SSE4.2, AVX, AVX2 | | AMD64, AES, CLMUL, FMA3, CVT16/F16C, ABM, BMI1, BMI2, SHA | |
| Zen | 7 TSMC N7 | Zen 2 | July 2019 | Matisse | Ryzen 9 (3900, Pro 3900, 3900X, 3900XT, 3950X) | 12/16 | Yes | 3100–3800 (4300–4700 boost) | 16.0 GT/s; PCIe | 32 KB inst. 32 KB data per core | 512 KB per core | 64 MB | Socket AM4 | Dual-channel DDR4 | MMX, SSE, SSE2, SSE3, SSE3s, SSE4a, SSE4.1, SSE4.2, AVX, AVX2 | | AMD64, AES, CLMUL, FMA3, CVT16/F16C, ABM, BMI1, BMI2, SHA | |
| Zen | 7 TSMC N7 | Zen 2 | August 2019 | Rome | EPYC 7002 series | 8/12/16/24/32/48/64 | Yes | 2000–3700 (3200–3900 boost) | 16.0 GT/s; PCIe | 32 KB inst. 32 KB data per core | 512 KB per core | 32–256 MB | Socket SP3 | Octa-channel DDR4 | MMX, SSE, SSE2, SSE3, SSE3s, SSE4a, SSE4.1, SSE4.2, AVX, AVX2 | | AMD64, AES, CLMUL, FMA3, CVT16/F16C, ABM, BMI1, BMI2, SHA | |
| Zen | 7 TSMC N7 | Zen 2 | November 2019 | Castle Peak | Ryzen Threadripper (3960X, 3970X, 3990X) | 24/32/64 | Yes | 2900–3800 (4300–4500 boost) | 16.0 GT/s; PCIe | 32 KB inst. 32 KB data per core | 512 KB per core | 128/128/256 MB | Socket sTRX4 | Quad-channel DDR4 | MMX, SSE, SSE2, SSE3, SSE3s, SSE4a, SSE4.1, SSE4.2, AVX, AVX2 | | AMD64, AES, CLMUL, FMA3, CVT16/F16C, ABM, BMI1, BMI2, SHA | |
| Zen | 7 TSMC N7 | Zen 2 | March 2020 | Renoir | Ryzen 3 4300U | 4 | No | 2700 (3700 boost) | 16.0 GT/s; PCIe | 32 KB inst. 32 KB data per core | 512 KB per core | 4 MB | Mobile: Socket FP6 Desktop: Socket AM4 | Mobile: Dual-channel DDR4 or LPDDR4 Desktop: Dual-channel DDR4 | MMX, SSE, SSE2, SSE3, SSE3s, SSE4a, SSE4.1, SSE4.2, AVX, AVX2 | | AMD64, AES, CLMUL, FMA3, CVT16/F16C, ABM, BMI1, BMI2, SHA | |
| Zen | 7 TSMC N7 | Zen 2 | March 2020 | Renoir | Ryzen 3 (4300G, 4300GE, 4350G, 4350GE, Pro 4450U) | 4 | Yes | 2500–3800 (3700–4200 boost) | 16.0 GT/s; PCIe | 32 KB inst. 32 KB data per core | 512 KB per core | 4 MB | Mobile: Socket FP6 Desktop: Socket AM4 | Mobile: Dual-channel DDR4 or LPDDR4 Desktop: Dual-channel DDR4 | MMX, SSE, SSE2, SSE3, SSE3s, SSE4a, SSE4.1, SSE4.2, AVX, AVX2 | | AMD64, AES, CLMUL, FMA3, CVT16/F16C, ABM, BMI1, BMI2, SHA | |
| Zen | 7 TSMC N7 | Zen 2 | March 2020 | Renoir | Ryzen 5 4500U | 6 | No | 2300 (4000 boost) | 16.0 GT/s; PCIe | 32 KB inst. 32 KB data per core | 512 KB per core | 8 MB | Mobile: Socket FP6 Desktop: Socket AM4 | Mobile: Dual-channel DDR4 or LPDDR4 Desktop: Dual-channel DDR4 | MMX, SSE, SSE2, SSE3, SSE3s, SSE4a, SSE4.1, SSE4.2, AVX, AVX2 | | AMD64, AES, CLMUL, FMA3, CVT16/F16C, ABM, BMI1, BMI2, SHA | |
| Zen | 7 TSMC N7 | Zen 2 | March 2020 | Renoir | Ryzen 5 (4600U, Pro 4650U, 4600H, 4600HS, 4680U), Ryzen 5 (4600G, 4600GE, Pro 4650G, Pro 4650GE) | 6 | Yes | 2100–3700 (4000–4200 boost) | 16.0 GT/s; PCIe | 32 KB inst. 32 KB data per core | 512 KB per core | 8 MB | Mobile: Socket FP6 Desktop: Socket AM4 | Mobile: Dual-channel DDR4 or LPDDR4 Desktop: Dual-channel DDR4 | MMX, SSE, SSE2, SSE3, SSE3s, SSE4a, SSE4.1, SSE4.2, AVX, AVX2 | | AMD64, AES, CLMUL, FMA3, CVT16/F16C, ABM, BMI1, BMI2, SHA | |
| Zen | 7 TSMC N7 | Zen 2 | March 2020 | Renoir | Ryzen 7 4700U | 8 | No | 2000 (4100 boost) | 16.0 GT/s; PCIe | 32 KB inst. 32 KB data per core | 512 KB per core | 8 MB | Mobile: Socket FP6 Desktop: Socket AM4 | Mobile: Dual-channel DDR4 or LPDDR4 Desktop: Dual-channel DDR4 | MMX, SSE, SSE2, SSE3, SSE3s, SSE4a, SSE4.1, SSE4.2, AVX, AVX2 | | AMD64, AES, CLMUL, FMA3, CVT16/F16C, ABM, BMI1, BMI2, SHA | |
| Zen | 7 TSMC N7 | Zen 2 | March 2020 | Renoir | Ryzen 7 (Pro 4750U, 4800U, 4800H, 4800HS), Ryzen 7 (4700G, 4700GE, Pro 4750G, Pro 4750GE), Ryzen 9 (4900H, 4900HS) | 8 | Yes | 1800–3600 (4100–4400 boost) | 16.0 GT/s; PCIe | 32 KB inst. 32 KB data per core | 512 KB per core | 8 MB | Mobile: Socket FP6 Desktop: Socket AM4 | Mobile: Dual-channel DDR4 or LPDDR4 Desktop: Dual-channel DDR4 | MMX, SSE, SSE2, SSE3, SSE3s, SSE4a, SSE4.1, SSE4.2, AVX, AVX2 | | AMD64, AES, CLMUL, FMA3, CVT16/F16C, ABM, BMI1, BMI2, SHA | |
| Zen | 7 TSMC N7 | Zen 2 | April 2022 | Renoir | Ryzen 3 4100 | 4 | Yes | 3800 (4000 boost) | 16.0 GT/s; PCIe | 32 KB inst. 32 KB data per core | 512 KB per core | 8 MB | Mobile: Socket FP6 Desktop: Socket AM4 | Mobile: Dual-channel DDR4 or LPDDR4 Desktop: Dual-channel DDR4 | MMX, SSE, SSE2, SSE3, SSE3s, SSE4a, SSE4.1, SSE4.2, AVX, AVX2 | | AMD64, AES, CLMUL, FMA3, CVT16/F16C, ABM, BMI1, BMI2, SHA | |
| Zen | 7 TSMC N7 | Zen 2 | April 2022 | Renoir | Ryzen 5 4500 | 6 | Yes | 3600 (4100 boost) | 16.0 GT/s; PCIe | 32 KB inst. 32 KB data per core | 512 KB per core | 8 MB | Mobile: Socket FP6 Desktop: Socket AM4 | Mobile: Dual-channel DDR4 or LPDDR4 Desktop: Dual-channel DDR4 | MMX, SSE, SSE2, SSE3, SSE3s, SSE4a, SSE4.1, SSE4.2, AVX, AVX2 | | AMD64, AES, CLMUL, FMA3, CVT16/F16C, ABM, BMI1, BMI2, SHA | |
| Zen | 7 TSMC N7 | Zen 2 | July 2020 | Castle Peak (Pro) | Ryzen Threadripper Pro (3945WX, 3955WX, 3975WX, 3995WX) | 12/16/32/64 | Yes | 2700–4000 (4200–4300 boost) | 16.0 GT/s; PCIe | 32 KB inst. 32 KB data per core | 512 KB per core | 64–256 MB (16 MB per CCX) | Socket sWRX8 | Octa-channel DDR4 | MMX, SSE, SSE2, SSE3, SSE3s, SSE4a, SSE4.1, SSE4.2, AVX, AVX2 | | AMD64, AES, CLMUL, FMA3, CVT16/F16C, ABM, BMI1, BMI2, SHA | |
| Zen | 7 TSMC N7 | Zen 2 | November 2020 | Grey Hawk | Ryzen Embedded V2000 series | 6/8 | Yes | 1700–3000 (3950–4250 boost) | 16.0 GT/s; PCIe | 32 KB inst. 32 KB data per core | 512 KB per core | 8 MB | Socket FP6 | Dual-channel DDR4 or Quad-channel LPDDR4 | MMX, SSE, SSE2, SSE3, SSE3s, SSE4a, SSE4.1, SSE4.2, AVX, AVX2 | | AMD64, AES, CLMUL, FMA3, CVT16/F16C, ABM, BMI1, BMI2, SHA | |
| Zen | 7 TSMC N7 | Zen 2 | January 2021 | Lucienne | Ryzen 3 5300U | 4 | Yes | 2600 (3800 boost) | 16.0 GT/s; PCIe | 32 KB inst. 32 KB data per core | 512 KB per core | 4 MB | Socket FP6 | Dual-channel DDR4 or LPDDR4 | MMX, SSE, SSE2, SSE3, SSE3s, SSE4a, SSE4.1, SSE4.2, AVX, AVX2 | | AMD64, AES, CLMUL, FMA3, CVT16/F16C, ABM, BMI1, BMI2, SHA | |
| Zen | 7 TSMC N7 | Zen 2 | January 2021 | Lucienne | Ryzen 5 5500U | 6 | Yes | 2100 (4000 boost) | 16.0 GT/s; PCIe | 32 KB inst. 32 KB data per core | 512 KB per core | 8 MB | Socket FP6 | Dual-channel DDR4 or LPDDR4 | MMX, SSE, SSE2, SSE3, SSE3s, SSE4a, SSE4.1, SSE4.2, AVX, AVX2 | | AMD64, AES, CLMUL, FMA3, CVT16/F16C, ABM, BMI1, BMI2, SHA | |
| Zen | 7 TSMC N7 | Zen 2 | January 2021 | Lucienne | Ryzen 7 5700U | 8 | Yes | 1800 (4300 boost) | 16.0 GT/s; PCIe | 32 KB inst. 32 KB data per core | 512 KB per core | 8 MB | Socket FP6 | Dual-channel DDR4 or LPDDR4 | MMX, SSE, SSE2, SSE3, SSE3s, SSE4a, SSE4.1, SSE4.2, AVX, AVX2 | | AMD64, AES, CLMUL, FMA3, CVT16/F16C, ABM, BMI1, BMI2, SHA | |
| Zen | 7 TSMC N7 | Zen 2 | Q4 2022 | Mendocino | Athlon Silver 7120U | 2 | No | 2400 (3500 boost) | 16.0 GT/s; PCIe | 32 KB inst. 32 KB data per core | 512 KB per core | 2 MB | Socket FT6 | Dual-channel LPDDR5 | MMX, SSE, SSE2, SSE3, SSE3s, SSE4a, SSE4.1, SSE4.2, AVX, AVX2 | | AMD64, AES, CLMUL, FMA3, CVT16/F16C, ABM, BMI1, BMI2, SHA | |
| Zen | 7 TSMC N7 | Zen 2 | Q4 2022 | Mendocino | Athlon Gold 7220U | 2 | Yes | 2400 (3700 boost) | 16.0 GT/s; PCIe | 32 KB inst. 32 KB data per core | 512 KB per core | 4 MB | Socket FT6 | Dual-channel LPDDR5 | MMX, SSE, SSE2, SSE3, SSE3s, SSE4a, SSE4.1, SSE4.2, AVX, AVX2 | | AMD64, AES, CLMUL, FMA3, CVT16/F16C, ABM, BMI1, BMI2, SHA | |
| Zen | 7 TSMC N7 | Zen 2 | Q4 2022 | Mendocino | Ryzen 7020 | 4 | Yes | 2400–2800 (4100–4300) | 16.0 GT/s; PCIe | 32 KB inst. 32 KB data per core | 512 KB per core | 4 MB | Socket FT6 | Dual-channel LPDDR5 | MMX, SSE, SSE2, SSE3, SSE3s, SSE4a, SSE4.1, SSE4.2, AVX, AVX2 | | AMD64, AES, CLMUL, FMA3, CVT16/F16C, ABM, BMI1, BMI2, SHA | |
| Zen | 7 TSMC N7 | Zen 3 | November 2020 | Vermeer | Ryzen 5 (5600X), Ryzen 7 (5800X), Ryzen 9 (5900X, 5950X) | 6/8/12/16 | Yes | 3400–3800 (4600–4900 boost) | 16.0 GT/s; PCIe | 32 KB inst. 32 KB data per core | 512 KB per core | 32–64 MB (32 MB per CCD/CCX) | Socket AM4 | Dual-channel DDR4 | MMX(+), SSE, SSE2, SSE3, SSE3s, SSE4a, SSE4.1, SSE4.2 x86-64, AMD-V, AVX, AVX2 | | AMD64, AES, CLMUL, FMA3, CVT16/F16C, ABM, BMI1, BMI2, SHA | |
| Zen | 7 TSMC N7 | Zen 3 | April 2022 | Vermeer | Ryzen 5 5600; Ryzen 7 5700X | 6/8 | Yes | 3400–3500 (4400–4600 boost) | 16.0 GT/s; PCIe | 32 KB inst. 32 KB data per core | 512 KB per core | 32–64 MB (32 MB per CCD/CCX) | Socket AM4 | Dual-channel DDR4 | MMX(+), SSE, SSE2, SSE3, SSE3s, SSE4a, SSE4.1, SSE4.2 x86-64, AMD-V, AVX, AVX2 | | AMD64, AES, CLMUL, FMA3, CVT16/F16C, ABM, BMI1, BMI2, SHA | |
| Zen | 7 TSMC N7 | Zen 3 | April 2022 | Vermeer | Ryzen 7 5800X3D | 8 | Yes | 3400 (4500 boost) | 16.0 GT/s; PCIe | 32 KB inst. 32 KB data per core | 512 KB per core | 96 MB | Socket AM4 | Dual-channel DDR4 | MMX(+), SSE, SSE2, SSE3, SSE3s, SSE4a, SSE4.1, SSE4.2 x86-64, AMD-V, AVX, AVX2 | | AMD64, AES, CLMUL, FMA3, CVT16/F16C, ABM, BMI1, BMI2, SHA | |
| Zen | 7 TSMC N7 | Zen 3 | January 2021 | Cezanne | Ryzen 3 (5300G, 5300GE, 5400U) | 4 | Yes | 2600–4000 (4000–4200 boost) | 16.0 GT/s; PCIe | 32 KB inst. 32 KB data per core | 512 KB per core | 8 MB | Mobile: Socket FP6 Desktop: Socket AM4 | Mobile: Dual-channel DDR4 or LPDDR4 Desktop: Dual-channel DDR4 | MMX(+), SSE, SSE2, SSE3, SSE3s, SSE4a, SSE4.1, SSE4.2 x86-64, AMD-V, AVX, AVX2 | | AMD64, AES, CLMUL, FMA3, CVT16/F16C, ABM, BMI1, BMI2, SHA | |
| Zen | 7 TSMC N7 | Zen 3 | January 2021 | Cezanne | Ryzen 5 (5600G, 5600GE, 5600U, 5600H, 5600HS) | 6 | Yes | 2300–3900 (4200–4400 boost) | 16.0 GT/s; PCIe | 32 KB inst. 32 KB data per core | 512 KB per core | 16 MB | Mobile: Socket FP6 Desktop: Socket AM4 | Mobile: Dual-channel DDR4 or LPDDR4 Desktop: Dual-channel DDR4 | MMX(+), SSE, SSE2, SSE3, SSE3s, SSE4a, SSE4.1, SSE4.2 x86-64, AMD-V, AVX, AVX2 | | AMD64, AES, CLMUL, FMA3, CVT16/F16C, ABM, BMI1, BMI2, SHA | |
| Zen | 7 TSMC N7 | Zen 3 | January 2021 | Cezanne | Ryzen 7 (5700G, 5700GE, 5800U, 5800H, 5800HS); Ryzen 9 (5900HS, 5900HX, 5980HS, 5980HX) | 8 | Yes | 1900–3800 (4400–4800 boost) | 16.0 GT/s; PCIe | 32 KB inst. 32 KB data per core | 512 KB per core | 16 MB | Mobile: Socket FP6 Desktop: Socket AM4 | Mobile: Dual-channel DDR4 or LPDDR4 Desktop: Dual-channel DDR4 | MMX(+), SSE, SSE2, SSE3, SSE3s, SSE4a, SSE4.1, SSE4.2 x86-64, AMD-V, AVX, AVX2 | | AMD64, AES, CLMUL, FMA3, CVT16/F16C, ABM, BMI1, BMI2, SHA | |
| Zen | 7 TSMC N7 | Zen 3 | June 2021 | Cezanne | Ryzen 3 PRO (5350G, 5350GE) | 4 | Yes | 3600–4000 (4200 boost) | 16.0 GT/s; PCIe | 32 KB inst. 32 KB data per core | 512 KB per core | 8 MB | Mobile: Socket FP6 Desktop: Socket AM4 | Mobile: Dual-channel DDR4 or LPDDR4 Desktop: Dual-channel DDR4 | MMX(+), SSE, SSE2, SSE3, SSE3s, SSE4a, SSE4.1, SSE4.2 x86-64, AMD-V, AVX, AVX2 | | AMD64, AES, CLMUL, FMA3, CVT16/F16C, ABM, BMI1, BMI2, SHA | |
| Zen | 7 TSMC N7 | Zen 3 | June 2021 | Cezanne | Ryzen 5 PRO (5650G, 5650GE) | 6 | Yes | 3400–3900 (4400 boost) | 16.0 GT/s; PCIe | 32 KB inst. 32 KB data per core | 512 KB per core | 16 MB | Mobile: Socket FP6 Desktop: Socket AM4 | Mobile: Dual-channel DDR4 or LPDDR4 Desktop: Dual-channel DDR4 | MMX(+), SSE, SSE2, SSE3, SSE3s, SSE4a, SSE4.1, SSE4.2 x86-64, AMD-V, AVX, AVX2 | | AMD64, AES, CLMUL, FMA3, CVT16/F16C, ABM, BMI1, BMI2, SHA | |
| Zen | 7 TSMC N7 | Zen 3 | June 2021 | Cezanne | Ryzen 7 PRO (5750G, 5750GE) | 8 | Yes | 3200–3800 (4600 boost) | 16.0 GT/s; PCIe | 32 KB inst. 32 KB data per core | 512 KB per core | 16 MB | Mobile: Socket FP6 Desktop: Socket AM4 | Mobile: Dual-channel DDR4 or LPDDR4 Desktop: Dual-channel DDR4 | MMX(+), SSE, SSE2, SSE3, SSE3s, SSE4a, SSE4.1, SSE4.2 x86-64, AMD-V, AVX, AVX2 | | AMD64, AES, CLMUL, FMA3, CVT16/F16C, ABM, BMI1, BMI2, SHA | |
| Zen | 7 TSMC N7 | Zen 3 | May 2022 | Cezanne / Barcelo | Ryzen 3 5125C | 2 | Yes | 3000 | 16.0 GT/s; PCIe | 32 KB inst. 32 KB data per core | 512 KB per core | 8 MB | Mobile: Socket FP6 Desktop: Socket AM4 | Mobile: Dual-channel DDR4 or LPDDR4 Desktop: Dual-channel DDR4 | MMX(+), SSE, SSE2, SSE3, SSE3s, SSE4a, SSE4.1, SSE4.2 x86-64, AMD-V, AVX, AVX2 | | AMD64, AES, CLMUL, FMA3, CVT16/F16C, ABM, BMI1, BMI2, SHA | |
| Zen | 7 TSMC N7 | Zen 3 | January 2022 | Cezanne / Barcelo | Ryzen 3 5425U | 4 | Yes | 2700 (4100 boost) | 16.0 GT/s; PCIe | 32 KB inst. 32 KB data per core | 512 KB per core | 8 MB | Mobile: Socket FP6 Desktop: Socket AM4 | Mobile: Dual-channel DDR4 or LPDDR4 Desktop: Dual-channel DDR4 | MMX(+), SSE, SSE2, SSE3, SSE3s, SSE4a, SSE4.1, SSE4.2 x86-64, AMD-V, AVX, AVX2 | | AMD64, AES, CLMUL, FMA3, CVT16/F16C, ABM, BMI1, BMI2, SHA | |
| Zen | 7 TSMC N7 | Zen 3 | April 2022 | Cezanne / Barcelo | Ryzen 3 PRO 5475U | 4 | Yes | 2700 (4100 boost) | 16.0 GT/s; PCIe | 32 KB inst. 32 KB data per core | 512 KB per core | 8 MB | Mobile: Socket FP6 Desktop: Socket AM4 | Mobile: Dual-channel DDR4 or LPDDR4 Desktop: Dual-channel DDR4 | MMX(+), SSE, SSE2, SSE3, SSE3s, SSE4a, SSE4.1, SSE4.2 x86-64, AMD-V, AVX, AVX2 | | AMD64, AES, CLMUL, FMA3, CVT16/F16C, ABM, BMI1, BMI2, SHA | |
| Zen | 7 TSMC N7 | Zen 3 | May 2022 | Cezanne / Barcelo | Ryzen 3 5425C | 4 | Yes | 2700 (4100 boost) | 16.0 GT/s; PCIe | 32 KB inst. 32 KB data per core | 512 KB per core | 8 MB | Mobile: Socket FP6 Desktop: Socket AM4 | Mobile: Dual-channel DDR4 or LPDDR4 Desktop: Dual-channel DDR4 | MMX(+), SSE, SSE2, SSE3, SSE3s, SSE4a, SSE4.1, SSE4.2 x86-64, AMD-V, AVX, AVX2 | | AMD64, AES, CLMUL, FMA3, CVT16/F16C, ABM, BMI1, BMI2, SHA | |
| Zen | 7 TSMC N7 | Zen 3 | January 2022 | Cezanne / Barcelo | Ryzen 5 5625U | 6 | Yes | 2300 (4300 boost) | 16.0 GT/s; PCIe | 32 KB inst. 32 KB data per core | 512 KB per core | 16 MB | Mobile: Socket FP6 Desktop: Socket AM4 | Mobile: Dual-channel DDR4 or LPDDR4 Desktop: Dual-channel DDR4 | MMX(+), SSE, SSE2, SSE3, SSE3s, SSE4a, SSE4.1, SSE4.2 x86-64, AMD-V, AVX, AVX2 | | AMD64, AES, CLMUL, FMA3, CVT16/F16C, ABM, BMI1, BMI2, SHA | |
| Zen | 7 TSMC N7 | Zen 3 | April 2022 | Cezanne / Barcelo | Ryzen 5 PRO 5675U | 6 | Yes | 2300 (4300 boost) | 16.0 GT/s; PCIe | 32 KB inst. 32 KB data per core | 512 KB per core | 16 MB | Mobile: Socket FP6 Desktop: Socket AM4 | Mobile: Dual-channel DDR4 or LPDDR4 Desktop: Dual-channel DDR4 | MMX(+), SSE, SSE2, SSE3, SSE3s, SSE4a, SSE4.1, SSE4.2 x86-64, AMD-V, AVX, AVX2 | | AMD64, AES, CLMUL, FMA3, CVT16/F16C, ABM, BMI1, BMI2, SHA | |
| Zen | 7 TSMC N7 | Zen 3 | May 2022 | Cezanne / Barcelo | Ryzen 5 5625C | 6 | Yes | 2300 (4300 boost) | 16.0 GT/s; PCIe | 32 KB inst. 32 KB data per core | 512 KB per core | 16 MB | Mobile: Socket FP6 Desktop: Socket AM4 | Mobile: Dual-channel DDR4 or LPDDR4 Desktop: Dual-channel DDR4 | MMX(+), SSE, SSE2, SSE3, SSE3s, SSE4a, SSE4.1, SSE4.2 x86-64, AMD-V, AVX, AVX2 | | AMD64, AES, CLMUL, FMA3, CVT16/F16C, ABM, BMI1, BMI2, SHA | |
| Zen | 7 TSMC N7 | Zen 3 | January 2022 | Cezanne / Barcelo | Ryzen 7 5825U | 8 | Yes | 2000 (4500 boost) | 16.0 GT/s; PCIe | 32 KB inst. 32 KB data per core | 512 KB per core | 16 MB | Mobile: Socket FP6 Desktop: Socket AM4 | Mobile: Dual-channel DDR4 or LPDDR4 Desktop: Dual-channel DDR4 | MMX(+), SSE, SSE2, SSE3, SSE3s, SSE4a, SSE4.1, SSE4.2 x86-64, AMD-V, AVX, AVX2 | | AMD64, AES, CLMUL, FMA3, CVT16/F16C, ABM, BMI1, BMI2, SHA | |
| Zen | 7 TSMC N7 | Zen 3 | April 2022 | Cezanne / Barcelo | Ryzen 7 PRO 5875U | 8 | Yes | 2000 (4500 boost) | 16.0 GT/s; PCIe | 32 KB inst. 32 KB data per core | 512 KB per core | 16 MB | Mobile: Socket FP6 Desktop: Socket AM4 | Mobile: Dual-channel DDR4 or LPDDR4 Desktop: Dual-channel DDR4 | MMX(+), SSE, SSE2, SSE3, SSE3s, SSE4a, SSE4.1, SSE4.2 x86-64, AMD-V, AVX, AVX2 | | AMD64, AES, CLMUL, FMA3, CVT16/F16C, ABM, BMI1, BMI2, SHA | |
| Zen | 7 TSMC N7 | Zen 3 | May 2022 | Cezanne / Barcelo | Ryzen 7 5825C | 8 | Yes | 2000 (4500 boost) | 16.0 GT/s; PCIe | 32 KB inst. 32 KB data per core | 512 KB per core | 16 MB | Mobile: Socket FP6 Desktop: Socket AM4 | Mobile: Dual-channel DDR4 or LPDDR4 Desktop: Dual-channel DDR4 | MMX(+), SSE, SSE2, SSE3, SSE3s, SSE4a, SSE4.1, SSE4.2 x86-64, AMD-V, AVX, AVX2 | | AMD64, AES, CLMUL, FMA3, CVT16/F16C, ABM, BMI1, BMI2, SHA | |
| Zen | 7 TSMC N7 | Zen 3 | January 2023 | Barcelo-R | Ryzen 7030 | 4/6/8 | Yes | 2000–2300 (4300–4500) | 16.0 GT/s; PCIe | 32 KB inst. 32 KB data per core | 512 KB per core | 8–16 MB | Mobile: Socket FP6 Desktop: Socket AM4 | Mobile: Dual-channel DDR4 or LPDDR4 Desktop: Dual-channel DDR4 | MMX(+), SSE, SSE2, SSE3, SSE3s, SSE4a, SSE4.1, SSE4.2 x86-64, AMD-V, AVX, AVX2 | | AMD64, AES, CLMUL, FMA3, CVT16/F16C, ABM, BMI1, BMI2, SHA | |
| Zen | 7 TSMC N7 | Zen 3 | March 2021 | Milan | EPYC 7003 series | 8/16/24/28/32/48/56/64 | Yes | 2000–3700 (3450–4100 boost) | 16.0 GT/s; PCIe | 32 KB inst. 32 KB data per core | 512 KB per core | 64–256 MB (16–32 MB per CCD/CCX) | Socket SP3 | Octa-channel DDR4 | MMX(+), SSE, SSE2, SSE3, SSE3s, SSE4a, SSE4.1, SSE4.2 x86-64, AMD-V, AVX, AVX2 | | AMD64, AES, CLMUL, FMA3, CVT16/F16C, ABM, BMI1, BMI2, SHA | |
| Zen | 7 TSMC N7 | Zen 3 | March 2022 | Milan-X | EPYC 7003X series | 16/24/32/64 | Yes | 2200–3050 (3500–3800 boost) | 16.0 GT/s; PCIe | 32 KB inst. 32 KB data per core | 512 KB per core | 768 MB | Socket SP3 | Octa-channel DDR4 | MMX(+), SSE, SSE2, SSE3, SSE3s, SSE4a, SSE4.1, SSE4.2 x86-64, AMD-V, AVX, AVX2 | | AMD64, AES, CLMUL, FMA3, CVT16/F16C, ABM, BMI1, BMI2, SHA | |
| Zen | 7 TSMC N7 | Zen 3 | March 2022 | Chagall | Ryzen Threadripper Pro (5945WX, 5955WX, 5965WX, 5975WX, 5995WX) | 12/16/24/32/64 | Yes | 2700–4100 (4500 boost) | 16.0 GT/s; PCIe | 32 KB inst. 32 KB data per core | 512 KB per core | 64–256 MB (32 MB per CCD/CCX) | Socket sWRX8 | Octa-channel DDR4 | MMX(+), SSE, SSE2, SSE3, SSE3s, SSE4a, SSE4.1, SSE4.2 x86-64, AMD-V, AVX, AVX2 | | AMD64, AES, CLMUL, FMA3, CVT16/F16C, ABM, BMI1, BMI2, SHA | |
| Zen | 6 TSMC N6 | Zen 3+ | January 2022 | Rembrandt | Ryzen 5 (6600U, 6600H, 6600HS); Ryzen 7 (6800U, 6800H, 6800HS); Ryzen 9 (6900HS, 6900HX, 6980HS, 6980HX) | 6/8 | Yes | 2700–3300 (4500–5000 boost) | | 32 KB inst. 32 KB data per core | 512 KB per core | 16 MB | Socket FP7 | Dual-channel DDR5 or LPDDR5 | MMX(+), SSE, SSE2, SSE3, SSE3s, SSE4a, SSE4.1, SSE4.2 x86-64, AMD-V, AVX, AVX2 | | AMD64, AES, CLMUL, FMA3, CVT16/F16C, ABM, BMI1, BMI2, SHA | |
| Zen | 6 TSMC N6 | Zen 3+ | April 2022 | Rembrandt | Ryzen 5 PRO (6650U, 6650H, 6650HS); Ryzen 7 PRO (6850U, 6850H, 6850HS); Ryzen 9 PRO (6950H, 6950HS) | 6/8 | Yes | 2700–3300 (4500–4900 boost) | | 32 KB inst. 32 KB data per core | 512 KB per core | 16 MB | Socket FP7 | Dual-channel DDR5 or LPDDR5 | MMX(+), SSE, SSE2, SSE3, SSE3s, SSE4a, SSE4.1, SSE4.2 x86-64, AMD-V, AVX, AVX2 | | AMD64, AES, CLMUL, FMA3, CVT16/F16C, ABM, BMI1, BMI2, SHA | |
| Zen | 6 TSMC N6 | Zen 3+ | January 2023 | Rembrandt-R | Ryzen 7035 | 4/6/8 | Yes | 2700–3300 (4300–4750) | | 32 KB inst. 32 KB data per core | 512 KB per core | 16 MB | Socket FP7 | Dual-channel DDR5 or LPDDR5 | MMX(+), SSE, SSE2, SSE3, SSE3s, SSE4a, SSE4.1, SSE4.2 x86-64, AMD-V, AVX, AVX2 | | AMD64, AES, CLMUL, FMA3, CVT16/F16C, ABM, BMI1, BMI2, SHA | |
| Zen | 5 TSMC N5 | Zen 4 | September 2022 | Raphael | Ryzen 5 (7600X); Ryzen 7 (7700X); Ryzen 9 (7900X, 7950X) | 6/8/12/16 | Yes | 4500–4700 (5300–5700 boost) | 16.0 GT/s; PCIe | 32 KB inst. 32 KB data per core | 1 MB per core | 32–64 MB (32 MB per CCD/CCX) | Socket AM5 | Dual-channel DDR5 | MMX(+), SSE, SSE2, SSE3, SSE3s, SSE4a, SSE4.1, SSE4.2 x86-64, AMD-V, AVX, AVX2, AVX-512 | | AMD64, AES, CLMUL, FMA3, CVT16/F16C, ABM, BMI1, BMI2, SHA | + AVX-512 |
| Zen | 5 TSMC N5 | Zen 4 | January 2023 | Raphael | Ryzen 5 7600; Ryzen 7 7700; Ryzen 9 7900 | 6/8/12 | Yes | 3700–3800 (5100–5400 boost) | 16.0 GT/s; PCIe | 32 KB inst. 32 KB data per core | 1 MB per core | 32–64 MB (32 MB per CCD/CCX) | Socket AM5 | Dual-channel DDR5 | MMX(+), SSE, SSE2, SSE3, SSE3s, SSE4a, SSE4.1, SSE4.2 x86-64, AMD-V, AVX, AVX2, AVX-512 | | AMD64, AES, CLMUL, FMA3, CVT16/F16C, ABM, BMI1, BMI2, SHA | + AVX-512 |
| Zen | 5 TSMC N5 | Zen 4 | April 2023 | Raphael | Ryzen 7 7800X3D | 8 | Yes | 4200 (5000 boost) | 16.0 GT/s; PCIe | 32 KB inst. 32 KB data per core | 1 MB per core | 96 MB | Socket AM5 | Dual-channel DDR5 | MMX(+), SSE, SSE2, SSE3, SSE3s, SSE4a, SSE4.1, SSE4.2 x86-64, AMD-V, AVX, AVX2, AVX-512 | | AMD64, AES, CLMUL, FMA3, CVT16/F16C, ABM, BMI1, BMI2, SHA | + AVX-512 |
| Zen | 5 TSMC N5 | Zen 4 | February 2023 | Raphael | Ryzen 9 7900X3D; Ryzen 9 7950X3D | 12/16 | Yes | 4200–4400 (5600–5700 boost) | 16.0 GT/s; PCIe | 32 KB inst. 32 KB data per core | 1 MB per core | 96+32 MB | Socket AM5 | Dual-channel DDR5 | MMX(+), SSE, SSE2, SSE3, SSE3s, SSE4a, SSE4.1, SSE4.2 x86-64, AMD-V, AVX, AVX2, AVX-512 | | AMD64, AES, CLMUL, FMA3, CVT16/F16C, ABM, BMI1, BMI2, SHA | + AVX-512 |
| Zen | 5 TSMC N5 | Zen 4 | March 2023 | Phoenix | Ryzen 7040 | 6/8 | Yes | 3800–4300 (5000–5200) | | 32 KB inst. 32 KB data per core | 1 MB per core | 16 MB | Socket FP7, FP7r2, FP8 | Dual-channel DDR5 or LPDDR5X | MMX(+), SSE, SSE2, SSE3, SSE3s, SSE4a, SSE4.1, SSE4.2 x86-64, AMD-V, AVX, AVX2, AVX-512 | | AMD64, AES, CLMUL, FMA3, CVT16/F16C, ABM, BMI1, BMI2, SHA | + AVX-512 |
| Zen | 5 TSMC N5 | Zen 4 | February 2023 | Dragon Range | Ryzen 7045 | 6/8/12/16 | Yes | 2500–4000 (5000–5400 boost) | | 32 KB inst. 32 KB data per core | 1 MB per core | 32–64 MB (32 MB per CCD/CCX) | Socket FL1 | Dual-channel DDR5 | MMX(+), SSE, SSE2, SSE3, SSE3s, SSE4a, SSE4.1, SSE4.2 x86-64, AMD-V, AVX, AVX2, AVX-512 | | AMD64, AES, CLMUL, FMA3, CVT16/F16C, ABM, BMI1, BMI2, SHA | + AVX-512 |
| Zen | 5 TSMC N5 | Zen 4 | November 2022 | Genoa | EPYC 9004 series | 16/24/32/48/64/84/96 | Yes | 2250–4100 (3700–4400 boost) | 32.0 GT/s; PCIe | 32 KB inst. 32 KB data per core | 1 MB per core | 64–384 MB (32 MB per CCD/CCX) | Socket SP5 | Dodeca-channel DDR5 | MMX(+), SSE, SSE2, SSE3, SSE3s, SSE4a, SSE4.1, SSE4.2 x86-64, AMD-V, AVX, AVX2, AVX-512 | | AMD64, AES, CLMUL, FMA3, CVT16/F16C, ABM, BMI1, BMI2, SHA | + AVX-512 |
| Architecture | Fabrication | Family | Release Date | Code Name | Model Group | Cores | SMT | Clock rate (MHz) | Bus Speed & Type | L1 | L2 | L3 | Socket | Memory Controller | SIMD | Speed/Power | Other | Changes |
| Architecture | Fabrication | Family | Release Date | Code Name | Model Group | Cores | SMT | Clock rate (MHz) | Bus Speed & Type | Cache | | | Socket | Memory Controller | Features | | | |

== See also ==
- List of AMD microprocessors
- List of AMD CPU microarchitectures
- List of AMD mobile microprocessors
- List of AMD Athlon microprocessors
- List of AMD Athlon XP microprocessors
- List of AMD Athlon 64 microprocessors
- List of AMD Athlon X2 microprocessors
- List of AMD Duron microprocessors
- List of AMD Sempron microprocessors
- List of AMD Turion microprocessors
- List of AMD Opteron microprocessors
- List of AMD Epyc microprocessors
- List of AMD Phenom microprocessors
- List of AMD FX microprocessors
- List of AMD Ryzen microprocessors
- List of AMD processors with 3D graphics
- List of Intel microprocessors
- List of Intel CPU microarchitectures
- Comparison of Intel processors
