= List of VIA Nano microprocessors =

The Nano microprocessor from VIA Technologies is an eighth-generation CPU targeted at the consumer and embedded market.

== Desktop and mobile processors ==
=== Nano L ===
==== "Nano 2000" series (65nm) ====
- All models support: MMX, SSE, SSE2, SSE3, SSSE3, x86-64, NX bit, VT-x (stepping 3 and higher), VIA PadLock (SHA, AES, RNG), VIA PowerSaver

Model number	Clock speed	L1 cache	L2 cache	FSB speed	Clock multiplier	TDP	Idle power	Socket	Cores	Release date
Nano L2200	1.6 GHz	64+64 KB	1024 KB	800 MHz	8×	17 W	200 mW	NanoBGA2	1	May 29, 2008
Nano L2207	1.6 GHz	64+64 KB	1024 KB	800 MHz	8×	17 W	200 mW	NanoBGA2	1	-
Nano L2007	1.6 GHz	64+64 KB	1024 KB	800 MHz	8×	25 W	500 mW	NanoBGA2	1	-
Nano L2100	1.8 GHz	64+64 KB	1024 KB	800 MHz	9×	25 W	500 mW	NanoBGA2	1	May 29, 2008
Nano L2107	1.8 GHz	64+64 KB	1024 KB	800 MHz	9×	25 W	500 mW	NanoBGA2	1	-

==== "Nano 3000" series (65nm) ====
- All models support: MMX, SSE, SSE2, SSE3, SSSE3, SSE4.1, x86-64, NX bit, VT-x, VIA PadLock (SHA, AES, RNG), VIA PowerSaver

Model number	Clock speed	L1 cache	L2 cache	FSB speed	Clock multiplier	TDP	Idle power	Socket	Cores	Release date	Part numbers
Nano L3025	1.6 GHz	64+64 KB	1024 KB	800 MHz	8×	W	500 mW	NanoBGA2	1	November 3, 2009	
Nano L3050	1.8 GHz	64+64 KB	1024 KB	800 MHz	9×	25W	500 mW	NanoBGA2	1	November 3, 2009	
Nano L3600	2 GHz	64+64 KB	1024 KB	800 MHz	10×	W	500 mW	NanoBGA2	1	November 3, 2009	

==== "Nano X2" (40nm) ====
Sources:

- All models support: MMX, SSE, SSE2, SSE3, SSSE3, SSE4.1, x86-64, NX bit, VT-x, VIA PadLock (SHA, AES, RNG), VIA PowerSaver
- Two Nano 3000 (Isaiah) in the same die

Marketing name	Model number	Clock speed	Turbo Speed	L1 cache	L2 cache	FSB speed	TDP	Idle power	Socket	Cores	Release date
Nano X2 E	L4050	1.4 GHz	1.4 GHz	64+64 KB per core	1 MB per core	1066 MHz	27.5 W		NanoBGA2	2	May 5, 2011
Nano X2 E	L4350E	1.6+ GHz	1.73 GHz	64+64 KB per core	1 MB per core	1066 MHz	27.5 W		NanoBGA2	2	May 5, 2011

==== "Nano QuadCore" (40nm) ====
- All models support: MMX, SSE, SSE2, SSE3, SSSE3, SSE4.1, x86-64, NX bit, VT-x, VIA PadLock (SHA, AES, RNG), VIA PowerSaver
- Two Nano x2 (Isaiah) in a Multi-chip module

Marketing name	Model number	Clock speed	Turbo Speed	L1 cache	L2 cache	FSB speed	TDP	Idle power	Socket	Cores	Release date
Nano QuadCore	L4800E	1.46+ GHz	1.6 GHz	64+64 KB per core	1 MB per core	1066 MHz	45 W	-	FCBGA	4	
Nano QuadCore	L4700E	1.2+ GHz	1.46 GHz	64+64 KB per core	1 MB per core	1066 MHz	27.5 W	-	FCBGA	4	May 5, 2011

=== Nano C ===
==== "Nano QuadCore" (28nm) ====
- All models support: MMX, SSE, SSE2, SSE3, SSSE3, SSE4.1, SSE4.2, AVX, AVX2, x86-64, NX bit, VT-x, VIA PadLock (SHA, AES, RNG), VIA PowerSaver
- Similar to Zhaoxin ZX-C

Marketing name	Model number	Clock speed	L1 cache	L2 cache	FSB speed	TDP	Socket	Cores	Release date
Nano QuadCore	C4650	2.0 GHz	64+64 KB per core	2 MB	1333 MHz	18 W	NanoBGA2	4	September 22, 2015

== Ultra-low voltage processors ==
=== Nano U ===
==== "Nano 1000/2000" series (65nm) ====
- All models support: MMX, SSE, SSE2, SSE3, SSSE3, x86-64, NX bit, VT-x (stepping 3 and higher), VIA PadLock (SHA, AES, RNG), VIA PowerSaver

Model number	Clock speed	Turbo Speed	L1 cache	L2 cache	FSB speed	Clock multiplier	TDP	Idle power	Socket	Cores	Release date	Part numbers
Nano U1700	1.0 GHz	1.3 GHz	64+64 KB	1 MB	800 MHz	10~13×	5 W	200 mW	NanoBGA2	1	May 29, 2008	
Nano U2300	1.0 GHz		64+64 KB	1 MB	533 MHz	7.5×	5 W	100 mW	NanoBGA2	1	May 29, 2008	
Nano U2225	1.3 GHz		64+64 KB	1 MB	800 MHz	13×	8 W	200 mW	NanoBGA2	1	May 29, 2008	
Nano U2250	1.3 GHz	1.6 GHz	64+64 KB	1 MB	800 MHz	13~16×	8 W	200 mW	NanoBGA2	1	May 29, 2008	
Nano U2500	1.2 GHz		64+64 KB	1 MB	800 MHz	12×	6.8 W	100 mW	NanoBGA2	1	May 29, 2008	

==== "Nano 3000" series (65nm) ====
Sources:

- All models support: MMX, SSE, SSE2, SSE3, SSSE3, SSE4.1, x86-64, NX bit, VT-x, VIA PadLock (SHA, AES, RNG), VIA PowerSaver

Model number	Clock speed	Turbo Speed	L1 cache	L2 cache	FSB speed	Clock multiplier	TDP	Idle power	Socket	Cores	Release date	Part numbers
Nano U3100	1.3 GHz	1.6 GHz	64+64 KB	1 MB	800 MHz	13~16x	9 W	100 mW	NanoBGA2	1	April 22, 2010	
Nano U3200	1.4 GHz		64+64 KB	1 MB	800 MHz	14x	10 W	100 mW	NanoBGA2	1	April 22, 2010	
Nano U3300	1.2 GHz		64+64 KB	1 MB	800 MHz	12×	6.8 W	100 mW	NanoBGA2	1	April 22, 2010	
Nano U3400	0.8 GHz		64+64 KB	1 MB	800 MHz	8x	3.5 W	100 mW	NanoBGA2	1	April 22, 2010	
Nano U3500	1.0 GHz		64+64 KB	1 MB	800 MHz	10×	5 W	100 mW	NanoBGA2	1	April 22, 2010	

==== "Nano X2" (40nm) ====
- All models support: MMX, SSE, SSE2, SSE3, SSSE3, SSE4.1, x86-64, NX bit, VT-x, VIA PadLock (SHA, AES, RNG), VIA PowerSaver
- Two Nano 3000 (Isaiah) in the same die

Marketing name	Model number	Clock speed	Turbo Speed	L1 cache	L2 cache	FSB speed	TDP	Idle power	Socket	Cores	Release date
Nano X2	U4025	1.2 GHz		64+64 KB per core	1 MB per core	1066 MHz	13 W		NanoBGA2	2	Jan 2011
Nano X2	U4200	1 GHz		64+64 KB per core	1 MB per core	1066 MHz	9 W		NanoBGA2	2	Jan 2011
Nano X2	U4300E	1.2+ GHz	1.46 GHz	64+64 KB per core	1 MB per core	1066 MHz	13 W		NanoBGA2	2	May 5, 2011

==== "Nano QuadCore" (40nm) ====
- All models support: MMX, SSE, SSE2, SSE3, SSSE3, SSE4.1, x86-64, NX bit, VT-x, VIA PadLock (SHA, AES, RNG), VIA PowerSaver
- Two Nano x2 (Isaiah) in a Multi-chip module

Marketing name	Model number	Clock speed	Turbo Speed	L1 cache	L2 cache	FSB speed	TDP	Idle power	Socket	Cores	Release date
Nano QuadCore	U4650E	1.0+ GHz	1.2 GHz	64+64 KB per core	1 MB per core	800 MHz	18 W	-	FCBGA	4	May 5, 2011

== See also ==
- List of VIA microprocessors
