= CPUID =

Instruction for x86 microprocessors

In the x86 architecture, the CPUID instruction (identified by a CPUID opcode) is a processor supplementary instruction (its name derived from "CPU Identification") allowing software to discover details of the processor. It was introduced by Intel in 1993 with the launch of the Pentium and late 486 processors.

A program can use the CPUID to determine processor type and whether features such as MMX/SSE are implemented.

== History ==
Prior to the general availability of the CPUID instruction, programmers would write esoteric machine code which exploited minor differences in CPU behavior in order to determine the processor make and model. With the introduction of the 80386 processor, EDX on reset indicated the revision but this was only readable after reset and there was no standard way for applications to read the value.

Outside the x86 family, developers are mostly still required to use esoteric processes (involving instruction timing or CPU fault triggers) to determine the variations in CPU design that are present.

For example, in the Motorola 68000 series — which never had a CPUID instruction of any kind — certain specific instructions required elevated privileges. These could be used to tell various CPU family members apart. In the Motorola 68010 the instruction MOVE from SR became privileged. Because the 68000 offered an unprivileged MOVE from SR the two different CPUs could be told apart by a CPU error condition being triggered.

While the CPUID instruction is specific to the x86 architecture, other architectures (like ARM) often provide on-chip registers which can be read in prescribed ways to obtain the same sorts of information provided by the x86 CPUID instruction.

== Calling CPUID ==
The CPUID opcode is 0F A2. Processor support for the instruction can be detected by successfully toggling the ID flag (bit 21) in the EFLAGS register.

In assembly language, the CPUID instruction takes no parameters as CPUID implicitly uses the EAX register to determine the main category of information returned. In Intel's more recent terminology, this is called the CPUID leaf. CPUID should be called with EAX = 0 first, as this will store in the EAX register the highest EAX calling parameter (leaf) that the CPU implements.

To obtain extended function information CPUID should be called with the most significant bit of EAX set. To determine the highest extended function calling parameter, call CPUID with EAX = 80000000h.

CPUID leaves greater than 3 but less than 0x80000000 are accessible only when the model-specific registers have IA32_MISC_ENABLE.BOOT_NT4 [bit 22] = 0 (which is so by default). As the name suggests, Windows NT 4.0 until SP6 only booted properly if this bit was set, but later versions of Windows do not need it, so basic leaves greater than 4 can be assumed visible on current Windows systems. As of April 2024, basic valid leaves go up to 23h, but the information returned by some leaves are not disclosed in the publicly available documentation, i.e. they are "reserved".

Some of the more recently added leaves also have sub-leaves, which are selected via the ECX register before calling CPUID.

== EAX=0: Highest Function Parameter and Manufacturer ID ==
This returns the CPU's manufacturer ID string – a twelve-character ASCII string stored in EBX, EDX, ECX (in that order). The highest basic calling parameter (the largest value that EAX can be set to before calling CPUID) is returned in EAX.

Here is a list of processors and the highest function implemented.

Highest Function Parameter
Processors	Basic	Extended
Earlier Intel 486	CPUID Not Implemented	
Later Intel 486 and Pentium	0x01	Not Implemented
Pentium Pro, Pentium II and Celeron	0x02	Not Implemented
Pentium III	0x03	Not Implemented
Pentium 4	0x02	0x8000 0004
Xeon	0x02	0x8000 0004
Pentium M	0x02	0x8000 0004
Pentium 4 with Hyper-Threading	0x05	0x8000 0008
Pentium D (8xx)	0x05	0x8000 0008
Pentium D (9xx)	0x06	0x8000 0008
Core Duo	0x0A	0x8000 0008
Core 2 Duo	0x0A	0x8000 0008
Xeon 3000, 5100, 5200, 5300, 5400 (5000 series)	0x0A	0x8000 0008
Core 2 Duo 8000 series	0x0D	0x8000 0008
Xeon 5200, 5400 series	0x0A	0x8000 0008
Atom	0x0A	0x8000 0008
Nehalem-based processors	0x0B	0x8000 0008
Ivy Bridge-based processors	0x0D	0x8000 0008
Skylake-based processors (proc base & max freq; Bus ref. freq)	0x16	0x8000 0008
System-On-Chip Vendor Attribute Enumeration Main Leaf	0x17	0x8000 0008
Meteor Lake-based processors	0x23	0x8000 0008

The following are ID strings used by actual processors, listed in order of their introduction:

- "GenuineIntel" – Intel
- "UMC UMC UMC " – UMC
- "AuthenticAMD" – AMD
- "CyrixInstead" – Cyrix – also licensed by STMicroelectronics and IBM
- "NexGenDriven" – NexGen
- "TI CPU@Work " – TI – 'Amazon' core – 'Dakota' P5-class chip – taped out – canceled end of 1996
- "CentaurHauls" – Centaur – owned by IDT, then VIA, then Zhaoxin
- "RiseRiseRise" – Rise
- "SiS SiS SiS " – SiS (ex-Rise)
- "GenuineTMx86" – Transmeta – used in standard CPUID leaf 0000_0000h, for Intel compatibility
- "TransmetaCPU" – Transmeta – used in extended CPUID leaf 8000_0000h and leaf 8086_0000h
- "Geode by NSC" – National Semiconductor – acquired by AMD
- "Vortex86 SoC" – DM&P Vortex86 (ex-SiS)
- "Genuine RDC" – RDC Semiconductor Co. Ltd. (ex-SiS)
- "HygonGenuine" – Hygon (AMD Zen lineage)
- " Shanghai " – Zhaoxin (Centaur Isaiah lineage)
- "EVOLUTIONARY" – EVOLUTIONARY (new lineage) – used in leaf 0000_0000h and 8000_0000h
- "GenuineIntel" – SSMEC clones – SM486DX-33 has no CPUID – SM486DX2-66 matches Intel's
- "GenuineIotel" – Intel – rare – likely caused by a 1-bit error – one full report + a few partial reports

The following are ID strings that are most likely bogus:

- ~~"VIA VIA VIA "~~ – sometimes cited, but no VIA processor with this string has ever been observed
- ~~"AMDisbetter!"~~ – sometimes cited, but no AMD processor with this string has ever been observed
- ~~"AMD ISBETTER"~~ – often cited, but no AMD K5 processor with this string has ever been observed; in particular, even the first K5 processor with Family/Model/Stepping 500h shipped with "AuthenticAMD"

The following are ID strings used by open source soft CPU cores:

- "GenuineAO486" – ao486 CPU (old)
- "MiSTer AO486" – ao486 CPU (new)
- "GenuineIntel" – v586 core (this is identical to the Intel ID string)

The following are ID strings used by virtual machines:

- (a variety of strings) – MCST Elbrus e2k processor when running dynamic binary translation software
  - "E2K MACHINE " – the strings are inconsistent – some (but not all) encode the motherboard type
  - "E8C-SWTX " – it is unknown whether the DBT SW pads with trailing spaces or trailing \0 chars
  - "EL2S4 "
  - "Elbrus-MCST "
  - "MBE1C-PC "
  - "MBE8C-PC v.2"
  - "MONOCUB "
- "ConnectixCPU" – Connectix Virtual PC (version 6 and lower)
- "Virtual CPU " – Microsoft Virtual PC 7; Microsoft x86-to-ARM (32-bit x86)
- "AuthenticAMD" – Microsoft x86-to-ARM (64-bit x86)
- "GenuineIntel" – Apple Rosetta 2
- "Insignia 586" – Insignia RealPC and SoftWindows 98
- "Compaq FX!32" – Compaq FX!32 (x86 emulator for DEC Alpha processors)
- "Neko Project" – Neko Project II (PC-98 emulator) (used when the CPU to emulate is set to "Neko Processor II")

For instance, on a GenuineIntel processor, values returned in EBX is 0x756e6547, EDX is 0x49656e69 and ECX is 0x6c65746e. The following example code displays the vendor ID string as well as the highest calling parameter that the CPU implements.

	.intel_syntax noprefix
	.text
.m0: .string "CPUID: %x\n"
.m1: .string "Largest basic function number implemented: %i\n"
.m2: .string "Vendor ID: %s\n"

    .globl main

main:
	push    r12
	mov	    eax, 1
	sub	    rsp, 16
    cpuid
    lea	    rdi, .m0[rip]
	mov	    esi, eax
	call	printf
	xor     eax, eax
    cpuid
	lea	    rdi, .m1[rip]
	mov	    esi, eax
	mov	    r12d, edx
	mov	    ebp, ecx
	call    printf
	mov     3[rsp], ebx
	lea	    rsi, 3[rsp]
    lea	    rdi, .m2[rip]
    mov     7[rsp], r12d
    mov     11[rsp], ebp
	call	printf
	add	    rsp, 16
	pop	    r12
	ret

    .section .note.GNU-stack,"",@progbits

On some processors, it is possible to modify the Manufacturer ID string reported by CPUID.(EAX=0) by writing a new ID string to particular MSRs (Model-specific registers) using the WRMSR instruction. This has been used on non-Intel processors to enable features and optimizations that have been disabled in software for CPUs that don't return the GenuineIntel ID string. Processors that are known to possess such MSRs include:

Processors with Manufacturer ID MSRs
Processor	MSRs
IDT WinChip	108h-109h
VIA C3, C7	1108h-1109h
VIA Nano	1206h-1207h
Transmeta Crusoe, Efficeon	80860001h-80860003h
AMD Geode GX, LX	3000h-3001h
DM&P Vortex86EX2	52444300h-52444301h

== EAX=1: Processor Info and Feature Bits ==
This returns the CPU's stepping, model, microarchitecture codename, and family information in register EAX (also called the signature of a CPU), feature flags in registers EDX and ECX, and additional feature info in register EBX.

CPUID EAX=1: Processor Version Information in EAX
EAX
31	30	29	28	27	26	25	24	23	22	21	20	19	18	17	16	15	14	13	12	11	10	9	8	7	6	5	4	3	2	1	0
Reserved				Extended Family ID								Extended Model ID				Reserved		Processor Type		Family ID				Model				Stepping ID			

- Stepping ID is a product revision number assigned due to fixed errata or other changes.
- The actual processor model is derived from the Model, Extended Model ID and Family ID fields. If the Family ID field is either 6 or 15, the model is equal to the sum of the Extended Model ID field shifted left by 4 bits and the Model field. Otherwise, the model is equal to the value of the Model field.
- The actual processor family is derived from the Family ID and Extended Family ID fields. If the Family ID field is equal to 15, the family is equal to the sum of the Extended Family ID and the Family ID fields. Otherwise, the family is equal to the value of the Family ID field.
- The meaning of the Processor Type field is given in the table below.

Processor Type
Type	Encoding in Binary
Original equipment manufacturer (OEM) Processor	00
Intel Overdrive Processor	01
Dual processor (applicable to Intel P5 Pentium processors only)	10
Reserved value	11

As of October 2023, the following x86 processor family IDs are known:

CPUID EAX=1: Processor Family IDs
Family ID + Extended Family ID		Intel	AMD	Other
hex	dec	Intel	AMD	Other
0h	0	—N/a	—N/a	—N/a
1h	1	—N/a	—N/a	—N/a
2h	2	—N/a	—N/a	—N/a
3h	3	(Note: The i386 processor does not support the CPUID instruction - it does however return Family ID 3h in the reset-value of EDX.)	—N/a	—N/a
4h	4	486	486, 5x86, Élan SC4xx/5xx	Cyrix 5x86, Cyrix MediaGX, UMC Green CPU, MCST Elbrus (most models), MiSTer ao486
5h	5	Pentium, Pentium MMX, Quark X1000	K5, K6	Cyrix 6x86, Cyrix MediaGXm, Geode (except NX), NexGen Nx586, IDT WinChip, IDT WinChip 2, IDT WinChip 3, Transmeta Crusoe, Rise mP6, SiS 550, DM&P Vortex86 (early), RDC IAD 100, MCST Elbrus-8C2
6h	6	Pentium Pro, Pentium II, Pentium III, Pentium M, Intel Core (all variants), Intel Atom (all variants), Xeon (except NetBurst variants), Xeon Phi (except KNC)	K7: Athlon, Athlon XP	Cyrix 6x86MX/MII, VIA C3, VIA C7, VIA Nano, DM&P Vortex86 (DX3,EX2), Zhaoxin ZX-A/B/C/C+, (Centaur CNS), MCST Elbrus-12C/16C/2C3
7h	7	Itanium (in IA-32 mode)	—N/a	Zhaoxin KaiXian, Zhaoxin KaisHeng
8h	8	(Note: Family ID 8h has been reported to have been deliberately avoided for the Pentium 4 processor family due to incompatibility with Windows NT 4.0.)	—N/a	—N/a
9h	9	—N/a	—N/a	—N/a
0Ah	10	—N/a	—N/a	—N/a
0Bh	11	Xeon Phi (Knights Corner)	—N/a	—N/a
0Ch	12	—N/a	—N/a	—N/a
0Dh	13	—N/a	—N/a	—N/a
0Eh	14	—N/a	—N/a	—N/a
0Fh	15	NetBurst (Pentium 4)	K8/Hammer (Athlon 64)	Transmeta Efficeon
10h	16	—N/a	K10: Phenom	—N/a
11h	17	Itanium 2 (in IA-32 mode)	Turion X2	—N/a
12h	18	Intel Core (Nova Lake and up)	Llano	—N/a
13h	19	Xeon (Panther Cove and up)	—N/a	—N/a
14h	20	—N/a	Bobcat	—N/a
15h	21	—N/a	Bulldozer, Piledriver, Steamroller, Excavator	—N/a
16h	22	—N/a	Jaguar, Puma	—N/a
17h	23	—N/a	Zen 1, Zen 2	—N/a
18h	24	—N/a	Hygon Dhyana	
19h	25	—N/a	Zen 3, Zen 4	—N/a
1Ah	26	—N/a	Zen 5, Zen 6	—N/a

CPUID EAX=1: Additional Information in EBX
Bits	EBX	Valid
7:0	Brand Index	
15:8	CLFLUSH line size (Value * 8 = cache line size in bytes)	if CLFLUSH feature flag is set. CPUID.01.EDX.CLFSH [bit 19]= 1
23:16	Maximum number of addressable IDs for logical processors in this physical package; The nearest power-of-2 integer that is not smaller than this value is the number of unique initial APIC IDs reserved for addressing different logical processors in a physical package. (Note: On CPUs with more than 128 logical processors in a single package (e.g. Intel Xeon Phi 7290 and AMD Threadripper Pro 7995WX) the value in bit 23:16 is set to a non-power-of-2 value.) Former use: Number of logical processors per physical processor; two for the Pentium 4 processor with Hyper-Threading Technology.	if Hyper-threading feature flag is set. CPUID.01.EDX.HTT [bit 28]= 1
31:24	Local APIC ID: The initial APIC-ID is used to identify the executing logical processor. (Note: The Local APIC ID can also be identified via the cpuid 0Bh leaf ( CPUID.0Bh.EDX[x2APIC-ID] ). On CPUs with more than 256 logical processors in one package (e.g. Xeon Phi 7290), leaf 0Bh must be used because the APIC ID does not fit into 8 bits.)	Pentium 4 and subsequent processors.

The processor info and feature flags are manufacturer specific but usually, the Intel values are used by other manufacturers for the sake of compatibility.

CPUID EAX=1: Feature Information in EDX and ECX
Bit	EDX		ECX (Note: On some older processors, executing CPUID with a leaf index (EAX) greater than 0 may leave EBX and ECX unmodified, keeping their old values. For this reason, it is recommended to zero out EBX and ECX before executing CPUID with a leaf index of 1. Processors noted to exhibit this behavior include Cyrix MII and IDT WinChip 2.)		Bit
Bit	Short	Feature	Short	Feature	Bit
0	fpu	Onboard x87 FPU	sse3	SSE3 (Prescott New Instructions - PNI)	0
1	vme	Virtual 8086 mode extensions (such as VIF, VIP, PVI)	pclmulqdq	PCLMULQDQ (carry-less multiply) instruction	1
2	de	Debugging extensions (CR4 bit 3)	dtes64	64-bit debug store (edx bit 21)	2
3	pse	Page Size Extension (4 MB pages)	monitor	MONITOR and MWAIT instructions (PNI)	3
4	tsc	Time Stamp Counter and RDTSC instruction	ds-cpl	CPL qualified debug store	4
5	msr	Model-specific registers and RDMSR/WRMSR instructions	vmx	Virtual Machine eXtensions	5
6	pae	Physical Address Extension	smx	Safer Mode Extensions (LaGrande) (GETSEC instruction)	6
7	mce	Machine Check Exception	est	Enhanced SpeedStep	7
8	cx8 (Note: On processors from IDT, Transmeta and Rise (vendor IDs CentaurHauls, GenuineTMx86 and RiseRiseRise), the CMPXCHG8B instruction is always supported, however the feature bit for the instruction might not be set. This is a workaround for a bug in Windows NT.)	CMPXCHG8B (compare-and-swap) instruction	tm2	Thermal Monitor 2	8
9	apic (Note: On early AMD K5 (AuthenticAMD Family 5 Model 0) processors only, EDX bit 9 used to indicate support for PGE instead. This was moved to bit 13 from K5 Model 1 onwards.)	Onboard Advanced Programmable Interrupt Controller	ssse3	Supplemental SSE3 instructions	9
10	(mtrr) (Note: Intel AP-485, revisions 006 to 008, lists CPUID.(EAX=1):EDX[bit 10] as having the name "MTRR" (albeit described as "Reserved"/"Do not count on their value") - this name was removed in later revisions of AP-485, and the bit has been listed as reserved with no name since then.)	(reserved)	cnxt-id	L1 Context ID	10
11	sep (Note: On Pentium Pro (GenuineIntel Family 6 Model 1) processors only, EDX bit 11 is invalid - the bit is set, but the SYSENTER and SYSEXIT instructions are not supported on the Pentium Pro.)	SYSENTER and SYSEXIT fast system call instructions	sdbg	Silicon Debug interface	11
12	mtrr	Memory Type Range Registers (Note: For the MTRRs, additional feature information is not available through CPUID, but instead through the read-only MTRRCAP MSR (MSR 0FEh). This MSR has the following layout: Bits / Usage; 7:0 / Number of variable-range MTRRs; 8 / Fixed-range MTRRs supported; 9 / (Reserved); 10 / Write-Combining memory type supported; 11 / SMRR (System-Management Range Register) supported; 12 / PRMRR (Processor Reserved Memory Range Register, part of SGX) supported; 13 / SMRR2 supported; 14 / SMRR-lock supported; 15 / SEAMRR (SEcure Arbitration Mode Range Register, part of TDX) supported; 63:16 / (Reserved))	fma	Fused multiply-add (FMA3)	12
13	pge	Page Global Enable bit in CR4	cx16	CMPXCHG16B instruction (Note: Some very early Intel 64 processors have the CMPXCHG16B feature bit set even though they do not support the instruction - this applies to GenuineIntel Family 0Fh Model 3 Stepping 4 chips (90nm Pentium 4) only.)	13
14	mca	Machine check architecture	xtpr	Can disable sending task priority messages	14
15	cmov	Conditional move: CMOV, FCMOV and FCOMI instructions (Note: FCMOV and FCOMI instructions only available if onboard x87 FPU also present (indicated by EDX bit 0).)	pdcm	Perfmon & debug capability	15
16	pat	Page Attribute Table	(reserved) (Note: ECX bit 16 is listed as "Reserved" in public Intel and AMD documentation and is not set in any known processor. However, some versions of the Windows Vista kernel are reported to be checking this bit - if it is set, Vista will recognize it as a "processor channels" feature.)		16
17	pse-36	36-bit page size extension	pcid	Process context identifiers (CR4 bit 17)	17
18	psn	Processor Serial Number supported and enabled (Note: On Intel and Transmeta CPUs that support PSN (Processor Serial Number), the PSN can be disabled by setting bit 21 of MSR 119h (BBL_CR_CTL) to 1. Doing so will remove leaf 3 and cause CPUID.(EAX=1):EDX[bit 18] to return 0.)	dca	Direct cache access for DMA writes	18
19	clfsh	CLFLUSH cache line flush instruction (SSE2)	sse4.1	SSE4.1 instructions	19
20	(nx)	No-execute (NX) bit (Itanium only, reserved on other CPUs) (Note: On non-Itanium x86 processors, support for the No-execute bit is indicated in CPUID.(EAX=8000_0001):EDX[bit 20] instead.)	sse4.2	SSE4.2 instructions	20
21	ds	Debug store: save trace of executed jumps	x2apic	x2APIC (enhanced APIC)	21
22	acpi	Onboard thermal control MSRs for ACPI	movbe	MOVBE instruction (big-endian)	22
23	mmx	MMX instructions (64-bit SIMD)	popcnt	POPCNT instruction	23
24	fxsr	FXSAVE, FXRSTOR instructions, CR4 bit 9	tsc-deadline	APIC implements one-shot operation using a TSC deadline value	24
25	sse	Streaming SIMD Extensions (SSE) instructions (aka "Katmai New Instructions"; 128-bit SIMD)	aes-ni	AES instruction set	25
26	sse2	SSE2 instructions	xsave	Extensible processor state save/restore: XSAVE, XRSTOR, XSETBV, XGETBV instructions	26
27	ss	CPU cache implements self-snoop	osxsave	XSAVE enabled by OS	27
28	htt	Max APIC IDs reserved field is Valid (Note: EDX bit 28, if set, indicates that bits 23:16 of CPUID.(EAX=1):EBX are valid. If this bit is not set, then the CPU package contains only 1 logical processor. In older documentation, this bit is often listed as a "Hyper-threading technology" flag - however, while this flag is a prerequisite for Hyper-Threading support, it does not by itself indicate support for Hyper-Threading and it has been set on many CPUs that do not feature any form of multi-threading technology.)	avx	Advanced Vector Extensions (256-bit SIMD)	28
29	tm	Thermal monitor automatically limits temperature	f16c	Floating-point conversion instructions to/from FP16 format	29
30	ia64	IA64 processor emulating x86	rdrnd	RDRAND (on-chip random number generator) feature	30
31	pbe	Pending Break Enable (PBE# pin) wakeup capability	hypervisor	Hypervisor present (always zero on physical CPUs)	31

Reserved fields should be masked before using them for processor identification purposes.

== EAX=2: Cache and TLB Descriptor Information ==
This returns a list of descriptors indicating cache and TLB capabilities in EAX, EBX, ECX and EDX registers.

On processors that support this leaf, calling CPUID with EAX=2 will cause the bottom byte of EAX to be set to 01h (Note: In older Intel documentation, the bottom byte of the value returned in EAX is described as specifying the number of times the CPUID must be called with EAX=2 to get hold of all the cache/TLB descriptors. However, all known processors that implement this leaf return 01h in this byte, and newer Intel documentation (SDM rev 053 and later) specifies this byte as having the value 01h.) and the remaining 15 bytes of EAX/EBX/ECX/EDX to be filled with 15 descriptors, one byte each. These descriptors provide information about the processor's caches, TLBs and prefetch. This is typically one cache or TLB per descriptor, but some descriptor-values provide other information as well — in particular, 00h is used for an empty descriptor, FFh indicates that the leaf does not contain valid cache information and that leaf 4h should be used instead, and FEh indicates that the leaf does not contain valid TLB information and that leaf 18h should be used instead. There are also some cases, such as descriptors 63h and C3h, where a single descriptor provides information about multiple TLBs. The descriptors may appear in any order.

For each of the four registers (EAX,EBX,ECX,EDX), if bit 31 is set, then the register should not be considered to contain valid descriptors (e.g. on Itanium in IA-32 mode, CPUID(EAX=2) returns 80000000h in EDX — this should be interpreted to mean that EDX contains no valid information, not that it contains a descriptor for a 512K L2 cache.)

The table below provides, for known descriptor values, a condensed description of the cache or TLB indicated by that descriptor value (or other information, where that applies). The suffixes used in the table are:

- K,M,G : kibibyte, mebibyte, gibibyte (capacity for caches, page-size for TLBs)
- E : entries (for TLBs; e.g. 64E = 64 entries)
- p : page-size (e.g. 4Kp for TLBs where each entry describes one 4 KiB page, 4K/2Mp for TLBs where each entry can describe either one 4 KiB page or one 2 MiB hugepage)
- L : cache-line size (e.g. 32L = 32-byte cache line size)
- S : cache sector size (e.g. 2S means that the cache uses sectors of 2 cache-lines each)
- A : associativity (e.g. 6A = 6-way set-associative, FA = fully-associative)

Legend for cache/TLB descriptor byte encodings
Level-1 instruction or data cache	Level-2 cache	Level-3 cache	Instruction or data TLB	Level-2 shared TLB	Other information	(reserved)

CPUID EAX=2: Cache/TLB descriptor byte encodings
	x0	x1	x2	x3	x4	x5	x6	x7		x8	x9	xA	xB	xC	xD	xE	xF	
0x	null descriptor	ITLB: 32E, 4Kp, 4A	ITLB: 2E, 4Mp, FA	DTLB: 64E, 4Kp, 4A	DTLB: 8E, 4Mp, 4A	DTLB: 32E, 4Mp, 4A	L1I: 8K, 4A, 32L		0x	L1I: 16K, 4A, 32L	L1I: 32K, 4A, 64L	L1D: 8K, 2A, 32L	ITLB: 4E, 4Mp, FA	L1D: 16K, 4A, 32L	L1D: 16K, 4A, 64L (Note: For descriptors 0Dh and 0Eh, Intel AP-485 rev 37 lists the caches they describe as having ECC - this was removed in rev 38 and later Intel documentation.)	L1D: 24K, 6A, 64L		0x
1x	(L1D: 16K, 4A, 32L) (Note: Descriptors 10h, 15h, 1Ah, 88h, 89h, 8Ah, 90h, 96h, 9Bh are documented for the IA-32 operation mode of Itanium only.)					(L1I: 16K, 4A, 32L)			1x			(L2C: 96K, 6A, 64L)			L2C: 128K, 2A, 64L			1x
2x		L2C: 256K, 8A, 64L (Note: The cache described by descriptor 21h is in some places (e.g. AP-485 rev 36 but not rev 37) referred to as an "MLC" (Mid-Level Cache).)	L3C: 512K, 4A, 64L, 2S	L3C: 1M, 8A, 64L, 2S	L2C: 1M, 16A, 64L	L3C: 2M, 8A, 64L, 2S	(128-byte prefetch) (Note: Descriptor values 26h,27h,28h and 81h are not listed in Intel documentation and are not used in any known released CPU. (81h has been seen in engineering samples of the cancelled Intel Timna.) They have nevertheless been reported to be recognized by the Windows NT kernel v5.1 (Windows XP) and higher. 81h is also recognized by v5.0 (Windows 2000).)	(128-byte prefetch)	2x	(128-byte prefetch)	L3C: 4M, 8A, 64L, 2S			L1D: 32K, 8A, 64L				2x
3x	L1I: 32K, 8A, 64L								3x		L2C: 128K, 4A, 64L, 2S (Note: Descriptors 39h-3Eh and 73h are listed in rev 36 of Intel AP-485, but have been removed from later Intel documentation even though several of them have been used in Intel CPUs (mostly in Netburst-based Celeron CPUs, e.g. 39h in "Willamette-128", 3Bh in "Northwood-128", and 3Ch in "Prescott-256").)	L2C: 192K, 6A, 64L, 2S	L2C: 128K, 2A, 64L, 2S	L2C: 256K, 4A, 64L, 2S	L2C: 384K, 6A, 64L, 2S	L2C: 512K, 4A, 64L, 2S	L2C: 256K, 2A, 64L (Note: Descriptor 3Fh is, as of November 2024, not listed in any known Intel documentation - it is nevertheless used in Intel Tolapai processors, and is listed in an Intel-provided Linux kernel patch.)	3x
4x	no L3 cache present	L2C: 128K, 4A, 32L	L2C: 256K, 4A, 32L (Note: Documentation for the VIA Cyrix III "Joshua" processor (CyrixInstead Family 6 Model 5) indicates that this processor uses descriptor values 74h and 77h for its TLBs, and values 42h and 82h for its caches - but does not specify which caches/TLBs in the processor each of these descriptor values correspond to.)	L2C: 512K, 4A, 32L	L2C: 1M, 4A, 32L	L2C: 2M, 4A, 32L	L3C: 4M, 4A, 64L	L3C: 8M, 8A, 64L	4x	L2C: 3M, 12A, 64L	L2C/L3C: (Note: Descriptor 49h indicates a level-3 cache on GenuineIntel Family 0Fh Model 6 (Pentium 4 based Xeon) CPUs, and a level-2 cache on other CPUs.); 4M,16A,64L	L3C: 6M, 12A, 64L	L3C: 8M, 16A, 64L	L3C: 12M, 12A, 64L	L3C: 16M, 16A, 64L	L2C: 6M, 24A, 64L	ITLB: 32E, 4Kp (Note: Intel's CPUID documentation does not specify the associativity of the ITLB indicated by descriptor 4Fh. The processors that use this descriptor (Intel Atom "Bonnell") are described elsewhere as having a fully-associative 32-entry ITLB.)	4x
5x	ITLB: 64E,FA, 4K/2M/4Mp	ITLB: 128E,FA, 4K/2M/4Mp	ITLB: 256E,FA, 4K/2M/4Mp			ITLB: 7E, 2M/4Mp, FA	DTLB: 16E, 4Mp, 4A	DTLB: 16E, 4Kp, 4A	5x		DTLB: 16E, 4Kp, FA	DTLB: 32E, 2M/4Mp, 4A	DTLB: 64E; 4K/4Mp, FA	DTLB: 128E, 4K/4Mp, FA	DTLB: 256E, 4K/4Mp, FA			5x
6x	L1D: 16K, 8A, 64L	ITLB: 48E, 4Kp, FA		Two DTLBs: 32E, 2M/4Mp, 4A + 4E, 1Gp, FA	DTLB: 512E, 4Kp, 4A		L1D: 8K, 4A, 64L	L1D: 16K, 4A, 64L	6x	L1D: 32K, 4A, 64L		DTLB: 64E, 4Kp, 8A	DTLB: 256E, 4Kp, 8A	DTLB: 128E, 2M/4Mp, 8A	DTLB: 16E, 1Gp, FA			6x
7x	Trace cache, 12K-μop, 8A (Note: On Cyrix and Geode CPUs (Vendor IDs CyrixInstead and Geode by NSC), descriptors 70h and 80h have a different meaning: Descriptor 70h indicates a 32-entry shared instruction+data 4-way-set-associative TLB with a 4K page size.; Descriptor 80h indicates a 16 KiB shared instruction+data L1 cache with 4-way set-associativity and a cache-line size of 16 bytes.)	Trace cache, 16K-μop, 8A	Trace cache, 32K-μop, 8A	Trace cache, 64K-μop, 8A			ITLB: 8E, 2M/4Mp, FA (Note: Descriptor 76h is listed as an 1 MiB L2 cache in rev 37 of Intel AP-485, but as an instruction TLB in rev 38 and all later Intel documentation.)	(L1I: 16K, 4A, 64L) (Note: Descriptors 77h, 7Eh, 8Dh are documented for the IA-32 operation mode of Itanium 2 only.)	7x	L2C: 1M, 4A, 64L	L2C: 128K, 8A, 64L, 2S	L2C: 256K, 8A, 64L, 2S	L2C: 512K, 8A, 64L, 2S	L2C: 1M, 8A, 64L, 2S	L2C: 2M, 8A, 64L	(L2C: 256K, 8A, 128L)	L2C: 512K, 2A, 64L	7x
8x	L2C: 512K, 8A, 64L	(L2C: 128K, 8A, 32L)	L2C: 256K, 8A, 32L	L2C: 512K, 8A, 32L	L2C: 1M, 8A, 32L	L2C: 2M, 8A, 32L	L2C: 512K, 4A, 64L	L2C: 1M, 8A, 64L	8x	(L3C: 2M, 4A, 64L)	(L3C: 4M, 4A, 64L)	(L3C: 8M, 4A, 64L)			(L3C: 3M, 12A, 128L) (Note: Under the IA-32 operation mode of Itanium 2, the L3 cache size is always reported as 3 MiB regardless of the actual size of the cache.)			8x
9x	(ITLB: 64E,FA, 4K-256Mp)						(DTLB: 32E,FA, 4K-256Mp)		9x				(DTLB: 96E,FA, 4K-256Mp)					9x
Ax	DTLB: 32E, 4Kp, FA								Ax									Ax
Bx	ITLB: 128E, 4Kp, 4A	ITLB: 8E, 2M/4Mp, 4A (Note: For descriptor B1h, the TLB capacity is 8 elements when using 2 MiB pages, but reduced to 4 elements when using 4 MiB pages.)	ITLB: 64E, 4Kp, 4A	DTLB: 128E, 4Kp, 4A	DTLB: 256E, 4Kp, 4A	ITLB: 64E, 4Kp, 8A	ITLB: 128E, 4Kp, 8A		Bx			DTLB: 64E, 4Kp, 4A						Bx
Cx	DTLB: 8E, 4K/4Mp, 4A	L2TLB: 1024E, 4K/2Mp, 8A	DTLB: 16E, 2M/4Mp, 4A	Two L2 STLBs: 1536E, 4K/2Mp, 6A (Note: For descriptor C3h, many Intel processors that use this descriptor have an L2 TLB that is 12-way set-associative, not 6-way set-associative. This applies to at least Skylake and Whiskey/Kaby/Coffee/Comet Lake CPUs.) + 16E, 1Gp, 4A	DTLB: 32E, 2M/4Mp, 4A				Cx			L2TLB: 512E, 4Kp, 4A						Cx
Dx	L3C: 512K, 4A, 64L	L3C: 1M, 4A, 64L	L3C: 2M, 4A, 64L				L3C: 1M, 8A, 64L	L3C: 2M, 8A, 64L	Dx	L3C: 4M, 8A, 64L				L3C: 1.5M, 12A, 64L	L3C: 3M, 12A, 64L	L3C: 6M, 12A, 64L		Dx
Ex			L3C: 2M, 16A, 64L	L3C: 4M, 16A, 64L	L3C: 8M, 16A, 64L				Ex			L3C: 12M, 24A, 64L	L3C: 18M, 24A, 64L	L3C: 24M, 24A, 64L				Ex
Fx	64-byte prefetch (Note: The prefetch specified by descriptors F0h and F1h is the recommended stride for memory prefetching with the PREFETCHNTA instruction.)	128-byte prefetch							Fx							Leaf 2 has no TLB info, use leaf 18h	Leaf 2 has no cache info, use leaf 4	Fx
	x0	x1	x2	x3	x4	x5	x6	x7		x8	x9	xA	xB	xC	xD	xE	xF	

== EAX=3: Processor Serial Number ==
This returns the processor's serial number. The processor serial number was introduced on Intel Pentium III, but due to privacy concerns, this feature is no longer implemented on later models (the PSN feature bit is always cleared). Transmeta's Efficeon and Crusoe processors also provide this feature. AMD CPUs however, do not implement this feature in any CPU models.

For Intel Pentium III CPUs, leaf 3 returns the bottom 64 bits of the 96-bit Processor Serial Number in EDX:ECX - the top 32 bits of the serial number are taken from the CPU signature returned in EAX when CPUID is called with EAX=1.

For Transmeta Crusoe and Efficeon CPUs, leaf 3 returns a 128-bit Processor Serial Number in EAX:EBX:ECX:EDX (The top 32 bits of this serial number, delivered in EAX, is always 0 on Crusoe processors but is known to be nonzero on at least some Efficeon processors.)

Note that the processor serial number feature must be enabled in the BIOS setting in order to function.

== EAX=4 and EAX=8000'001Dh: Cache Hierarchy and Topology ==
These two leaves are used to provide information about the cache hierarchy levels available to the processor core on which the CPUID instruction is run. Leaf 4 is used on Intel processors and leaf 8000'001Dh is used on AMD processors - they both return data in EAX, EBX, ECX and EDX, using the same data format except that leaf 4 returns a few additional fields that are considered "reserved" for leaf 8000'001Dh. They both provide CPU cache information in a series of sub-leaves selected by ECX - to get information about all the cache levels, it is necessary to invoke CPUID repeatedly, with EAX=4 or 8000'001Dh and ECX set to increasing values starting from 0 (0,1,2,...) until a sub-leaf not describing any caches (EAX[4:0]=0) is found. The sub-leaves that do return cache information may appear in any order, but all of them will appear before the first sub-leaf not describing any caches.

In the below table, fields that are defined for leaf 4 but not for leaf 8000'001Dh are highlighted with yellow cell coloring and a (#4) item.

CPUID EAX=4 and 8000'001Dh: Cache property information in EAX, EBX and EDX
Bit	EAX	EBX	EDX (Note: Intel AP-485, revisions 31 and 32, list bits 9:0 of EDX as a "Prefetch Stride" field - this was removed in revision 33 and all later Intel documentation, and no processor is known to use EDX in this manner.)	Bit
0	Cache Type: 0: (No more caches); 1: Data Cache; 2: Instruction Cache; 3: Unified Cache; 4-31: (reserved)	System coherency line size in bytes, minus 1	WBINVD cache invalidation execution scope. A value of 0 indicates that the INVD/WBINVD instructions will invalidate all lower-levels caches of this cache, including caches that belong to sibling processors sharing this cache. A value of 1 indicates that lower-level caches of sibling processors that are sharing this cache are not guaranteed to be all cleared.	0
1	Cache Type: 0: (No more caches); 1: Data Cache; 2: Instruction Cache; 3: Unified Cache; 4-31: (reserved)	System coherency line size in bytes, minus 1	Cache inclusiveness. If 1, then cache is inclusive of lower-level caches.	1
2	Cache Type: 0: (No more caches); 1: Data Cache; 2: Instruction Cache; 3: Unified Cache; 4-31: (reserved)	System coherency line size in bytes, minus 1	Complex cache indexing. If 1, then cache uses a complex function for cache indexing, else the cache is direct-mapped. (#4)	2
3	Cache Type: 0: (No more caches); 1: Data Cache; 2: Instruction Cache; 3: Unified Cache; 4-31: (reserved)	System coherency line size in bytes, minus 1	(reserved)	3
4	Cache Type: 0: (No more caches); 1: Data Cache; 2: Instruction Cache; 3: Unified Cache; 4-31: (reserved)	System coherency line size in bytes, minus 1	(reserved) (Note: EDX bit 4 is not listed in any known public Intel documentation, but has been observed to be set for the level-2 cache of Intel Xeon Phi x200 ("Knights Landing") processors.)	4
7:5	Cache Level (starting from 1)	System coherency line size in bytes, minus 1	(reserved)	7:5
8	Self initializing cache level (1=doesn't need software initialization after reset)	System coherency line size in bytes, minus 1	(reserved)	8
9	Fully Associative Cache	System coherency line size in bytes, minus 1	(reserved)	9
10	(WBINVD cache invalidation execution scope) (Note: For CPUID leaf 4, bits 11:10 of EAX are documented for the Xeon Phi "Knights Corner" (GenuineIntel Family 0Bh) processor only. For other processors, bits 1:0 of EDX should be used instead.) (#4)	System coherency line size in bytes, minus 1	(reserved)	10
11	(Cache Inclusiveness) (#4)	System coherency line size in bytes, minus 1	(reserved)	11
13:12	(reserved)	Physical line partitions (number of cache lines that share a cache address tag), minus 1	(reserved)	13:12
21:14	Maximum number of addressable IDs for logical processors sharing this cache, minus 1	Physical line partitions (number of cache lines that share a cache address tag), minus 1	(reserved)	21:14
25:22	Maximum number of addressable IDs for logical processors sharing this cache, minus 1	Ways of cache associativity, minus 1	(reserved)	25:22
31:26	Maximum number of addressable IDs for processor cores in physical package, minus 1 (#4)	Ways of cache associativity, minus 1	(reserved)	31:26

For any caches that are valid and not fully-associative, the value returned in ECX is the number of sets in the cache minus 1. (For fully-associative caches, ECX should be treated as if it return the value 0.) For any given cache described by a sub-leaf of CPUID leaf 4 or 8000'001Dh, the total cache size in bytes can be computed as:

CacheSize = (EBX[11:0]+1) * (EBX[21:12]+1) * (EBX[31:22]+1) * (ECX+1)

For example, on Intel Crystalwell CPUs, executing CPUID with EAX=4 and ECX=4 will cause the processor to return the following size information for its level-4 cache in EBX and ECX: EBX=03C0F03F and ECX=00001FFF - this should be taken to mean that this cache has a cache line size of 64 bytes (EBX[11:0]+1), has 16 cache lines per tag (EBX[21:12]+1), is 16-way set-associative (EBX[31:22]+1) with 8192 sets (ECX+1), for a total size of 64*16*16*8192=134217728 bytes, or 128 mebibytes.

== EAX=4 and EAX=Bh: Intel Thread/Core and Cache Topology ==
These two leaves are used for processor topology (thread, core, package) and cache hierarchy enumeration in Intel multi-core (and hyperthreaded) processors. As of 2013 AMD does not use these leaves but has alternate ways of doing the core enumeration.

Unlike most other CPUID leaves, leaf Bh will return different values in EDX depending on which logical processor the CPUID instruction runs; the value returned in EDX is actually the x2APIC id of the logical processor. The x2APIC id space is not continuously mapped to logical processors, however; there can be gaps in the mapping, meaning that some intermediate x2APIC ids don't necessarily correspond to any logical processor. Additional information for mapping the x2APIC ids to cores is provided in the other registers. Although the leaf Bh has sub-leaves (selected by ECX as described further below), the value returned in EDX is only affected by the logical processor on which the instruction is running but not by the subleaf.

The processor(s) topology exposed by leaf Bh is a hierarchical one, but with the strange caveat that the order of (logical) levels in this hierarchy doesn't necessarily correspond to the order in the physical hierarchy (SMT/core/package). However, every logical level can be queried as an ECX subleaf (of the Bh leaf) for its correspondence to a "level type", which can be either SMT, core, or "invalid". The level id space starts at 0 and is continuous, meaning that if a level id is invalid, all higher level ids will also be invalid. The level type is returned in bits 15:08 of ECX, while the number of logical processors at the level queried is returned in EBX. Finally, the connection between these levels and x2APIC ids is returned in EAX[4:0] as the number of bits that the x2APIC id must be shifted in order to obtain a unique id at the next level.

As an example, a dual-core Westmere processor capable of hyperthreading (thus having two cores and four threads in total) could have x2APIC ids 0, 1, 4 and 5 for its four logical processors. Leaf Bh (=EAX), subleaf 0 (=ECX) of CPUID could for instance return 100h in ECX, meaning that level 0 describes the SMT (hyperthreading) layer, and return 2 in EBX because there are two logical processors (SMT units) per physical core. The value returned in EAX for this 0-subleaf should be 1 in this case, because shifting the aforementioned x2APIC ids to the right by one bit gives a unique core number (at the next level of the level id hierarchy) and erases the SMT id bit inside each core. A simpler way to interpret this information is that the last bit (bit number 0) of the x2APIC id identifies the SMT/hyperthreading unit inside each core in our example. Advancing to subleaf 1 (by making another call to CPUID with EAX=Bh and ECX=1) could for instance return 201h in ECX, meaning that this is a core-type level, and 4 in EBX because there are 4 logical processors in the package; EAX returned could be any value greater than 3, because it so happens that bit number 2 is used to identify the core in the x2APIC id. Note that bit number 1 of the x2APIC id is not used in this example. However, EAX returned at this level could well be 4 (and it happens to be so on a Clarkdale Core i3 5x0) because that also gives a unique id at the package level (=0 obviously) when shifting the x2APIC id by 4 bits. Finally, you may wonder what the EAX=4 leaf can tell us that we didn't find out already. In EAX[31:26] it returns the APIC mask bits reserved for a package; that would be 111b in our example because bits 0 to 2 are used for identifying logical processors inside this package, but bit 1 is also reserved although not used as part of the logical processor identification scheme. In other words, APIC ids 0 to 7 are reserved for the package, even though half of these values don't map to a logical processor.

The cache hierarchy of the processor is explored by looking at the sub-leaves of leaf 4. The APIC ids are also used in this hierarchy to convey information about how the different levels of cache are shared by the SMT units and cores. To continue our example, the L2 cache, which is shared by SMT units of the same core but not between physical cores on the Westmere is indicated by EAX[26:14] being set to 1, while the information that the L3 cache is shared by the whole package is indicated by setting those bits to (at least) 111b. The cache details, including cache type, size, and associativity are communicated via the other registers on leaf 4.

Beware that older versions of the Intel app note 485 contain some misleading information, particularly with respect to identifying and counting cores in a multi-core processor; errors from misinterpreting this information have even been incorporated in the Microsoft sample code for using CPUID, even for the 2013 edition of Visual Studio, but the Intel code sample for identifying processor topology has the correct interpretation, and the current Intel Software Developer's Manual has a more clear language. The (open source) cross-platform production code from Wildfire Games also implements the correct interpretation of the Intel documentation.

Topology detection examples involving older (pre-2010) Intel processors that lack x2APIC (thus don't implement the EAX=Bh leaf) are given in a 2010 Intel presentation. Beware that using that older detection method on 2010 and newer Intel processors may overestimate the number of cores and logical processors because the old detection method assumes there are no gaps in the APIC id space, and this assumption is violated by some newer processors (starting with the Core i3 5x0 series), but these newer processors also come with an x2APIC, so their topology can be correctly determined using the EAX=Bh leaf method.

== EAX=5: MONITOR/MWAIT Features ==
This returns feature information related to the MONITOR and MWAIT instructions in the EAX, EBX, ECX and EDX registers.

CPUID EAX=5: MONITOR/MWAIT feature information in EAX, EBX, EDX
Bit	EAX	EBX	EDX	Bit
3:0	Smallest monitor-line size in bytes	Largest monitor-line size in bytes	Number of C0 (Note: The C0 to C7 states are processor-specific C-states, which do not necessarily correspond 1:1 to ACPI C-states.) sub-states supported for MWAIT	3:0
7:4	Smallest monitor-line size in bytes	Largest monitor-line size in bytes	Number of C1 sub-states supported for MWAIT	7:4
11:8	Smallest monitor-line size in bytes	Largest monitor-line size in bytes	Number of C2 sub-states supported for MWAIT	11:8
15:12	Smallest monitor-line size in bytes	Largest monitor-line size in bytes	Number of C3 sub-states supported for MWAIT	15:12
19:16	(reserved)	(reserved)	Number of C4 sub-states supported for MWAIT	19:16
23:20	(reserved)	(reserved)	Number of C5 sub-states supported for MWAIT	23:20
27:24	(reserved)	(reserved)	Number of C6 sub-states supported for MWAIT	27:24
31:28	(reserved)	(reserved)	Number of C7 sub-states supported for MWAIT	31:28

CPUID EAX=5: MONITOR/MWAIT extension enumeration in ECX
Bit	ECX	
Bit	Short	Feature
0	EMX	Enumeration of MONITOR/MWAIT extensions in ECX and EDX supported
1	IBE	Supports treating interrupts as break-events for MWAIT even when interrupts are disabled
2	(reserved)	
3	Monitorless_MWAIT	Allow MWAIT to be used for power management without setting up memory monitoring with MONITOR
31:4	(reserved)	

== EAX=6: Thermal and Power Management ==
This returns feature bits in the EAX register and additional information in the EBX, ECX and EDX registers.

CPUID EAX=6: Thermal/power management feature bits in EAX
Bit	EAX	
Bit	Short	Feature
0	DTS	Digital Thermal Sensor capability
1	TURBO_BOOST	Intel Turbo Boost Technology capability
2	ARAT (Note: On Intel Pentium 4 family processors (GenuineIntel family 0Fh) only, bit 2 of EAX is used to indicate OPP (Operating Point Protection) instead of ARAT.)	Always Running APIC Timer capability
3	(reserved)	
4	PLN	Power Limit Notification capability
5	ECMD	Extended Clock Modulation Duty capability
6	PTM	Package Thermal Management capability
7	HWP	Hardware-controlled Performance States. MSRs added: IA32_PM_ENABLE(770h); IA32_HWP_CAPABILITIES(771h); IA32_HWP_REQUEST(774h); IA32_HWP_STATUS(777h)
8	HWP_Notification	HWP notification of dynamic guaranteed performance change - IA32_HWP_INTERRUPT(773h) MSR
9	HWP_Activity_Window	HWP Activity Window control - bits 41:32 of IA32_HWP_REQUEST MSR
10	HWP_Energy_Performance_Preference	HWP Energy/performance preference control - bits 31:24 of IA32_HWP_REQUEST MSR
11	HWP_Package_Level_Request	HWP Package-level control - IA32_HWP_REQUEST_PKG(772h) MSR
12	(reserved)	
13	HDC	Hardware Duty Cycling supported. MSRs added: IA32_PKG_HDC_CTL (DB0h); IA32_PM_CTL1 (DB1h); IA32_THREAD_STALL (DB2h)
14	TURBO_BOOST_MAX	Intel Turbo Boost Max Technology 3.0 available
15	HWP_CAP	Interrupts upon changes to IA32_HWP_CAPABILITIES.Highest_Performance (bits 7:0) supported
16	HWP_PECI_OVERRIDE	HWP PECI override supported - bits 63:60 of IA32_HWP_PECI_REQUEST_INFO(775h) MSR
17	FLEXIBLE_HWP	Flexible HWP - bits 63:59 of IA32_HWP_REQUEST MSR
18	HWP_REQUEST_FAST_ACCESS	Fast access mode for IA32_HWP_REQUEST MSR supported (Note: To enable fast (non-serializing) access mode for the IA32_HWP_REQUEST MSR on CPUs that support it, it is necessary to set bit 0 of the FAST_UNCORE_MSRS_CTL(657h) MSR.)
19	HW_FEEDBACK	Hardware Feedback Interface. Added MSRs: IA32_HW_FEEDBACK_PTR(17D0h); IA32_HW_FEEDBACK_CONFIG(17D1h) (bit 0 enables HFI, bit 1 enables Intel Thread Director)
20	HWP_REQUEST_IGNORE_IDLE	IA32_HWP_REQUEST of idle logical processor ignored when only one of two logical processors that share a physical processor is active.
21	(reserved)	
22	HWP Control MSR	IA32_HWP_CTL(776h) MSR supported
23	THREAD_DIRECTOR	Intel Thread Director supported. Added MSRs: IA32_THREAD_FEEDBACK_CHAR(17D2h); IA32_HW_FEEDBACK_THREAD_CONFIG(17D4h)
24	DIRECTED_PKG_THERM_INT	(IA32_THERM_INTERRUPT MSR bit 25 supported) (Note: The CPUID.(EAX=6):EAX[24] bit is listed in revisions 078 to 087 of the Intel SDM, but was removed from revision 088 onwards - it was later added back in rev 063 of the Intel ISE. As of November 2026, it is not set in any known processor.)
25	HFI_INIT_TABLE	HW_FEEDBACK_CONFIG MSR bit 3 – HFI initialization table
31:26	(reserved)	

CPUID EAX=6: Thermal/power management feature fields in EBX, ECX and EDX
Bit	EBX	ECX	EDX	Bit
0	Number of Interrupt Thresholds in Digital Thermal Sensor	Effective frequency interface supported - IA32_MPERF(0E7h) and IA32_APERF(0E8h) MSRs	Hardware Feedback reporting: Performance Capability Reporting supported	0
1	Number of Interrupt Thresholds in Digital Thermal Sensor	(ACNT2 Capability) (Note: The "ACNT2 Capability" bit is listed in Intel AP-485 rev 038 and 039, but not listed in any revision of the Intel SDM. The feature is known to exist in only a few Intel CPUs, e.g. Xeon "Harpertown" stepping E0.)	Hardware Feedback reporting: Efficiency Capability Reporting supported	1
2	Number of Interrupt Thresholds in Digital Thermal Sensor	(reserved)	(reserved)	2
3	Number of Interrupt Thresholds in Digital Thermal Sensor	Performance-Energy Bias capability - IA32_ENERGY_PERF_BIAS(1B0h) MSR	(reserved)	3
7:4	(reserved)	(reserved)	(reserved)	7:4
11:8	(reserved)	Number of Intel Thread Director classes supported by hardware	Size of Hardware Feedback interface structure (in units of 4 KiB) minus 1	11:8
15:12	(reserved)	Number of Intel Thread Director classes supported by hardware	(reserved)	15:12
31:16	(reserved)	(reserved)	Index of this logical processor's row in hardware feedback interface structure	31:16

== EAX=7, ECX=0: Extended Features ==
This returns extended feature flags in EBX, ECX, and EDX. Returns the maximum ECX value for EAX=7 in EAX.

CPUID EAX=7,ECX=0: Extended feature bits in EBX, ECX and EDX
Bit	EBX		ECX		EDX		Bit
Bit	Short	Feature	Short	Feature	Short	Feature	Bit
0	fsgsbase	Access to base of %fs and %gs	prefetchwt1	PREFETCHWT1 instruction	(sgx-tem) (Note: As of April 2024, the FZM, MPRR and SGX_TEM bits are listed only in Intel TDX documentation and are not set in any known processor.)	?	0
1	tsc_adjust	IA32_TSC_ADJUST MSR	avx512-vbmi	AVX-512 Vector Bit Manipulation Instructions	sgx-keys	Attestation Services for Intel SGX	1
2	sgx	Software Guard Extensions	umip	User-mode Instruction Prevention	avx512-4vnniw	AVX-512 4-register Neural Network Instructions	2
3	bmi1	Bit Manipulation Instruction Set 1	pku	Memory Protection Keys for User-mode pages	avx512-4fmaps	AVX-512 4-register Multiply Accumulation Single precision	3
4	hle	TSX Hardware Lock Elision	ospke	PKU enabled by OS	fsrm	Fast Short REP MOVSB	4
5	avx2	Advanced Vector Extensions 2	waitpkg	Timed pause and user-level monitor/wait instructions (TPAUSE, UMONITOR, UMWAIT)	uintr	User Inter-processor Interrupts	5
6	fdp-excptn-only	x87 FPU data pointer register updated on exceptions only	avx512-vbmi2	AVX-512 Vector Bit Manipulation Instructions 2	(reserved)		6
7	smep	Supervisor Mode Execution Prevention	cet_ss/shstk	Control flow enforcement (CET): shadow stack (SHSTK alternative name)	(reserved)		7
8	bmi2	Bit Manipulation Instruction Set 2	gfni	Galois Field instructions	avx512-vp2intersect	AVX-512 vector intersection instructions on 32/64-bit integers	8
9	erms	Enhanced REP MOVSB/STOSB	vaes	Vector AES instruction set (VEX-256/EVEX)	srbds-ctrl	Special Register Buffer Data Sampling Mitigations	9
10	invpcid	INVPCID instruction	vpclmulqdq	CLMUL instruction set (VEX-256/EVEX)	md-clear	VERW instruction clears CPU buffers	10
11	rtm	TSX Restricted Transactional Memory	avx512-vnni	AVX-512 Vector Neural Network Instructions	rtm-always-abort	All TSX transactions are aborted	11
12	rdt-m/pqm	Intel Resource Director (RDT) Monitoring or AMD Platform QOS Monitoring	avx512-bitalg	AVX-512 BITALG instructions	(reserved)		12
13	fcs_fds_deprecation	x87 FPU CS and DS deprecated	tme_en	Total Memory Encryption MSRs available	rtm-force-abort	TSX_FORCE_ABORT (MSR 0x10f) is available	13
14	mpx	Intel MPX (Memory Protection Extensions)	avx512-vpopcntdq	AVX-512 Vector Population Count Double and Quad-word	serialize	SERIALIZE instruction	14
15	rdt-a/pqe	Intel Resource Director (RDT) Allocation or AMD Platform QOS Enforcement	(fzm)	?	hybrid	Mixture of CPU types in processor topology (e.g. Alder Lake)	15
16	avx512-f	AVX-512 Foundation	la57	5-level paging (57 address bits)	tsxldtrk	TSX load address tracking suspend/resume instructions (TSUSLDTRK and TRESLDTRK)	16
17	avx512-dq	AVX-512 Doubleword and Quadword Instructions	mawau	The value of userspace MPX Address-Width Adjust used by the BNDLDX and BNDSTX Intel MPX instructions in 64-bit mode	(reserved)		17
18	rdseed	RDSEED instruction	mawau	The value of userspace MPX Address-Width Adjust used by the BNDLDX and BNDSTX Intel MPX instructions in 64-bit mode	pconfig	Platform configuration (Memory Encryption Technologies Instructions)	18
19	adx	Intel ADX (Multi-Precision Add-Carry Instruction Extensions)	mawau	The value of userspace MPX Address-Width Adjust used by the BNDLDX and BNDSTX Intel MPX instructions in 64-bit mode	lbr	Architectural Last Branch Records	19
20	smap	Supervisor Mode Access Prevention	mawau	The value of userspace MPX Address-Width Adjust used by the BNDLDX and BNDSTX Intel MPX instructions in 64-bit mode	cet-ibt	Control flow enforcement (CET): indirect branch tracking	20
21	avx512-ifma	AVX-512 Integer Fused Multiply-Add Instructions	mawau	The value of userspace MPX Address-Width Adjust used by the BNDLDX and BNDSTX Intel MPX instructions in 64-bit mode	(reserved)		21
22	(pcommit)	(PCOMMIT instruction, deprecated)	rdpid	RDPID (Read Processor ID) instruction and IA32_TSC_AUX MSR	amx-bf16	AMX tile computation on bfloat16 numbers	22
23	clflushopt	CLFLUSHOPT instruction	kl	AES Key Locker	avx512-fp16	AVX-512 half-precision floating-point arithmetic instructions	23
24	clwb	CLWB (Cache line writeback) instruction	bus-lock-detect	Bus lock debug exceptions	amx-tile	AMX tile load/store instructions	24
25	pt	Intel Processor Trace	cldemote	CLDEMOTE (Cache line demote) instruction	amx-int8	AMX tile computation on 8-bit integers	25
26	avx512-pf	AVX-512 Prefetch Instructions	(mprr)	?	ibrs / spec_ctrl	Speculation Control, part of Indirect Branch Control (IBC): Indirect Branch Restricted Speculation (IBRS) and Indirect Branch Prediction Barrier (IBPB)	26
27	avx512-er	AVX-512 Exponential and Reciprocal Instructions	movdiri	MOVDIRI instruction	stibp	Single Thread Indirect Branch Predictor, part of IBC	27
28	avx512-cd	AVX-512 Conflict Detection Instructions	movdir64b	MOVDIR64B (64-byte direct store) instruction	L1D_FLUSH	IA32_FLUSH_CMD MSR	28
29	sha	SHA-1 and SHA-256 extensions	enqcmd	Enqueue Stores and EMQCMD/EMQCMDS instructions	arch_capabilities	IA32_ARCH_CAPABILITIES MSR (lists speculative side channel mitigations)	29
30	avx512-bw	AVX-512 Byte and Word Instructions	sgx-lc	SGX Launch Configuration	core_capabilities	IA32_CORE_CAPABILITIES MSR (lists model-specific core capabilities)	30
31	avx512-vl	AVX-512 Vector Length Extensions	pks	Protection keys for supervisor-mode pages	ssbd	Speculative Store Bypass Disable, as mitigation for Speculative Store Bypass (IA32_SPEC_CTRL)	31

== EAX=7, ECX=1: Extended Features ==
This returns extended feature flags in all four registers.

CPUID EAX=7,ECX=1: Extended feature bits in EAX, EBX, ECX, and EDX
Bit	EAX		EBX		ECX		EDX		Bit
Bit	Short	Feature	Short	Feature	Short	Feature	Short	Feature	Bit
0	sha512	SHA-512 extensions	ppin	Intel PPIN (Protected Processor Inventory Number): IA32_PPIN_CTL (04Eh) and IA32_PPIN (04Fh) MSRs.	RDT_M_ASYM	Asymmetric RDT Monitoring capability	(reserved)		0
1	sm3	SM3 hash extensions	pbndkb	Total Storage Encryption: PBNDKB instruction and TSE_CAPABILITY (9F1h) MSR.	RDT_A_ASYM	Asymmetric RDT Allocation capability	(avx512-vnni-fp16)	? (Note: As of April 2026, the "mpsadbw_512", "avx512-rao-fp", "avx-rao-fp", "avx512-vnni-fp16", "avx512-vnni-int8", "avx512-ne-convert", "avx512-vnni-int16" and "avx512-bf16-ne" bits are listed only in a set of Intel TDX module ABI tables from April 2026 and are not set in any known processor.)	1
2	sm4	SM4 cipher extensions	(reserved)		(legacy_reduced_isa)	(X86S, cancelled)	(avx512-vnni-int8)	?	2
3	rao-int	Remote Atomic Operations on integers: AADD, AAND, AOR, AXOR instructions	CPUIDMAXVAL_LIM_RMV	If 1, then bit 22 of IA32_MISC_ENABLE cannot be set to 1 to limit the value returned by CPUID.(EAX=0):EAX[7:0].	(reserved)		(avx512-ne-convert)	?	3
4	avx-vnni	AVX Vector Neural Network Instructions (VNNI) (VEX encoded)	(reserved)		(sipi64)	64-bit SIPI (Startup InterProcessor Interrupt) (part of cancelled X86S)	avx-vnni-int8	AVX VNNI INT8 instructions	4
5	avx512-bf16	AVX-512 instructions for bfloat16 numbers	(reserved)		MSR_IMM	Immediate forms of the RDMSR and WRMSRNS instructions	avx-ne-convert	AVX no-exception FP conversion instructions (bfloat16↔FP32 and FP16→FP32)	5
6	lass	Linear Address Space Separation (CR4 bit 27)	(reserved)		(reserved)		(reserved)		6
7	cmpccxadd	CMPccXADD instructions	(reserved)		(reserved)		(reserved)		7
8	archperfmonext	Architectural Performance Monitoring Extended Leaf (EAX=23h)	(reserved)		IA32_SOC_CAPABILITIES	IA32_SOC_CAPABILITIES MSR supported	amx-complex	AMX support for "complex" tiles (TCMMIMFP16PS and TCMMRLFP16PS)	8
9	(dedup) (Note: As of April 2024, the DEDUP bit is listed only in Intel TDX documentation and is not set in any known processor.)	?	(reserved)		(reserved)		(reserved)		9
10	fzrm	Fast zero-length REP MOVSB	(reserved)		USER_DOITM	User-mode data operand independent timing mode instructions (RDDOITM, SETDOITM, WRDOITM in ring 3)	avx-vnni-int16	AVX VNNI INT16 instructions	10
11	fsrs	Fast short REP STOSB	(reserved)		ace	AI Compute Extensions	(avx512-vnni-int16)	?	11
12	rsrcs	Fast short REP CMPSB and REP SCASB	(reserved)		(reserved)		(reserved)		12
13	(reserved)		(reserved)		(reserved)		utmr	User-timer events: IA32_UINTR_TIMER (1B00h) MSR	13
14	(reserved)		(reserved)		(reserved)		prefetchi	Instruction-cache prefetch instructions (PREFETCHIT0 and PREFETCHIT1) (Note: On AMD processors, support for the instruction-cache prefetch instructions is not indicated by CPUID.(EAX=7,ECX=1):EDX[14] but instead by CPUID.(EAX=8000_0021h):EAX[20].)	14
15	(reserved)		(reserved)		(reserved)		user_msr	User-mode MSR access instructions (URDMSR and UWRMSR)	15
16	(reserved)		(reserved)		(reserved)		(avx512-bf16-ne)	?	16
17	fred	Flexible Return and Event Delivery	(reserved)		(reserved)		uiret-uif-from-rflags	If 1, the UIRET (User Interrupt Return) instruction will set UIF (User Interrupt Flag) to the value of bit 1 of the RFLAGS image popped off the stack.	17
18	lkgs	LKGS Instruction	(reserved)		(reserved)		cet-sss	If 1, then Control-Flow Enforcement (CET) Supervisor Shadow Stacks (SSS) are guaranteed not to become prematurely busy as long as shadow stack switching does not cause page faults on the stack being switched to.	18
19	wrmsrns	WRMSRNS instruction (non-serializing write to MSRs)	(reserved)		(reserved)		avx10	AVX10 Converged Vector ISA (see also leaf 24h)	19
20	nmi_src	NMI source reporting	(reserved)		(reserved)		(reserved)		20
21	amx-fp16	AMX instructions for FP16 numbers	(reserved)		(reserved)		APX_F	Advanced Performance Extensions, Foundation (adds REX2 and extended EVEX prefix encodings to support 32 GPRs, as well as some new instructions)	21
22	hreset	HRESET instruction, IA32_HRESET_ENABLE (17DAh) MSR, and Processor History Reset Leaf (EAX=20h)	(reserved)		(reserved)		SEC_TEE_ATTESTATION	If 1, then trusted execution environment technologies (Intel TDX and Intel SGX) support attestation rooted in the on-chip Security Engine.	22
23	avx-ifma	AVX IFMA instructions	(reserved)		(reserved)		mwait	MWAIT instruction (Note: Support for the MWAIT instruction may be indicated by either CPUID.(EAX=1).ECX[3] or CPUID.(EAX=7,ECX=1).EDX[23]. (One or both may be set.) The former indicates support for the MONITOR instruction as well, while the latter does not indicate one way or another whether the MONITOR instruction is present. MWAIT without MONITOR may be present in systems that support the "Monitorless MWAIT" feature (which is itself indicated by CPUID.(EAX=5).ECX[3].))	23
24	(reserved)		(reserved)		(reserved)		slsm	Static Lockstep Mode (bit 0 of IA32_INTEGRITY_STATUS MSR is available)	24
25	(reserved)		(reserved)		(reserved)		(reserved)		25
26	lam	Linear Address Masking	(reserved)		(reserved)		(reserved)		26
27	msrlist	RDMSRLIST and WRMSRLIST instructions, and the IA32_BARRIER (02Fh) MSR	(reserved)		(reserved)		(reserved)		27
28	(reserved)		(mpsadbw_512)	?	(reserved)		(reserved)		28
29	(reserved)		(reserved)		(reserved)		(reserved)		29
30	invd_disable_post_bios_done	If 1, supports INVD instruction execution prevention after BIOS Done.	(avx512-rao-fp)	?	(reserved)		(reserved)		30
31	MOVRS	MOVRS and PREFETCHRST2 instructions supported (memory read/prefetch with read-shared hint)	(avx512-rao-fp)	?	(reserved)		(reserved)		31

== EAX=7, ECX=2: Extended Features ==
This returns extended feature flags in EDX.

EAX, EBX and ECX are reserved.

CPUID EAX=7,ECX=2: Extended feature bits in EDX
Bit	EDX	
Bit	Short	Feature
0	psfd	Fast Store Forwarding Predictor disable supported. (SPEC_CTRL (MSR 48h) bit 7)
1	ipred_ctrl	IPRED_DIS controls supported. (SPEC_CTRL bits 3 and 4) IPRED_DIS prevents instructions at an indirect branch target from speculatively executing until the branch target address is resolved.
2	rrsba_ctrl	RRSBA behavior disable supported. (SPEC_CTRL bits 5 and 6)
3	ddpd_u	Data Dependent Prefetcher disable supported. (SPEC_CTRL bit 8)
4	bhi_ctrl	BHI_DIS_S behavior enable supported. (SPEC_CTRL bit 10) BHI_DIS_S prevents predicted targets of indirect branches executed in ring0/1/2 from being selected based on branch history from branches executed in ring 3.
5	mcdt_no	If set, the processor does not exhibit MXCSR configuration dependent timing.
6	UC_LOCK_DISABLE	UC-lock disable feature (with UC-lock exceptions reported as #AC) supported.
7	monitor_mitg_no	If set, indicates that the MONITOR/UMONITOR instructions are not affected by performance/power issues caused by the instructions exceeding the capacity of an internal monitor tracking table.
8	SUP_DOITM	Supervisor-mode data operand independent timing mode instructions (RDDOITM, SETDOITM, WRDOITM in ring 0)
9	SSBD_PSFD_U_S	If set, the processor supports the SSBD_U and SSBD_S bits (speculative store bypass disable) and the PSFD_U and PSFD_S bits (fast store forwarding predictor disable) of the IA32_SPEC_CTRL MSR.
31:10	(reserved)	

== EAX=0Dh: XSAVE Features and State Components ==
This leaf is used to enumerate XSAVE features and state components.

The XSAVE instruction set extension is designed to save/restore CPU extended state (typically for the purpose of context switching) in a manner that can be extended to cover new instruction set extensions without the OS context-switching code needing to understand the specifics of the new extensions. This is done by defining a series of state-components, each with a size and offset within a given save area, and each corresponding to a subset of the state needed for one CPU extension or another. The EAX=0Dh CPUID leaf is used to provide information about which state-components the CPU supports and what their sizes/offsets are, so that the OS can reserve the proper amount of space and set the associated enable-bits.

The state-components can be subdivided into two groups: user-state (state-items that are visible to the application, e.g. AVX-512 vector registers), and supervisor-state (state items that affect the application but are not directly user-visible, e.g. user-mode interrupt configuration). The user-state items are enabled by setting their associated bits in the XCR0 control register, while the supervisor-state items are enabled by setting their associated bits in the IA32_XSS (0DA0h) MSR - the indicated state items then become the state-components that can be saved and restored with the XSAVE/XRSTOR family of instructions.

The XSAVE mechanism can handle up to 63 state-components in this manner. State-components 0 and 1 (x87 and SSE, respectively) have fixed offsets and sizes — for state-components 2 to 62, their sizes, offsets and a few additional flags can be queried by executing CPUID with EAX=0Dh and ECX set to the index of the state-component. This will return the following items in EAX, EBX and ECX (with EDX being reserved):

CPUID EAX=0Dh, ECX≥2: XSAVE state-component information
Bit	EAX	EBX	ECX	Bit
0	Size (in bytes) of state-component	Offset (in bytes) of state-component from the start of the XSAVE/XRSTOR save area (This offset is 0 for supervisor state-components, since these can only be saved/restored with the XSAVES/XRSTORS instructions, which always use compacting.)	User/supervisor state-component: 0=user-state (enabled through XCR0); 1=supervisor-state (enabled through IA32_XSS)	0
1	Size (in bytes) of state-component	Offset (in bytes) of state-component from the start of the XSAVE/XRSTOR save area (This offset is 0 for supervisor state-components, since these can only be saved/restored with the XSAVES/XRSTORS instructions, which always use compacting.)	64-byte alignment enable when state save compaction is used. If this bit is set for a state-component, then, when storing state with compaction, padding will be inserted between the preceding state-component and this state-component as needed to provide 64-byte alignment. If this bit is not set, the state-component will be stored directly after the preceding one.	1
2	Size (in bytes) of state-component	Offset (in bytes) of state-component from the start of the XSAVE/XRSTOR save area (This offset is 0 for supervisor state-components, since these can only be saved/restored with the XSAVES/XRSTORS instructions, which always use compacting.)	XFD Faulting supported for state-component.	2
31:3	Size (in bytes) of state-component	Offset (in bytes) of state-component from the start of the XSAVE/XRSTOR save area (This offset is 0 for supervisor state-components, since these can only be saved/restored with the XSAVES/XRSTORS instructions, which always use compacting.)	(reserved)	31:3

Attempting to query an unsupported state-component in this manner results in EAX,EBX,ECX and EDX all being set to 0.

Sub-leaves 0 and 1 of CPUID leaf 0Dh are used to provide feature information:

CPUID EAX=0Dh,ECX=0: XSAVE features
EBX	ECX	EDX:EAX
Maximum size (in bytes) of XSAVE save area for the set of state-components currently set in XCR0.	Maximum size (in bytes) of XSAVE save area if all state-components supported by XCR0 on this CPU were enabled at the same time.	64-bit bitmap of state-components supported by XCR0 on this CPU.

CPUID EAX=0Dh,ECX=1: XSAVE extended features
EAX	EBX	EDX:ECX
XSAVE feature flags (see below table)	Size (in bytes) of XSAVE area containing all the state-components currently set in XCR0 and IA32_XSS combined.	64-bit bitmap of state-components supported by IA32_XSS on this CPU.

CPUID EAX=0Dh,ECX=1: XSAVE feature flags in EAX
Bit	EAX	
Bit	Short	Feature
0	xsaveopt	XSAVEOPT instruction: save state-components that have been modified since last XRSTOR
1	xsavec	XSAVEC instruction: save/restore state with compaction
2	xgetbv_ecx1	XGETBV with ECX=1 support
3	xss	XSAVES and XRSTORS instructions and IA32_XSS MSR: save/restore state with compaction, including supervisor state.
4	xfd	XFD (Extended Feature Disable) supported
31:5	(reserved)	

As of July 2023, the XSAVE state-components that have been architecturally defined are:

XSAVE State-components
Index	Description	Enabled with
0	x87 state	XCR0 (Note: Bit 0 of XCR0 is hardwired to 1, so that the XSAVE instructions will always support save/restore of x87 state.)
1	SSE state: XMM0-XMM15 and MXCSR	XCR0
2	AVX state: top halves of YMM0 to YMM15	XCR0
3	MPX state: BND0-BND3 bounds registers	XCR0
4	MPX state: BNDCFGU and BNDSTATUS registers	XCR0
5	AVX-512 state: opmask registers k0-k7	XCR0
6	AVX-512 "ZMM_Hi256" state: top halves of ZMM0 to ZMM15	XCR0
7	AVX-512 "Hi16_ZMM" state: ZMM16-ZMM31	XCR0
8	Processor Trace state	IA32_XSS
9	PKRU (User Protection Keys) register	XCR0
10	PASID (Process Address Space ID) state	IA32_XSS
11	CET_U state (Control-flow Enforcement Technology: user-mode functionality MSRs)	IA32_XSS
12	CET_S state (CET: shadow stack pointers for rings 0,1,2)	IA32_XSS
13	HDC (Hardware Duty Cycling) state	IA32_XSS
14	UINTR (User-Mode Interrupts) state	IA32_XSS
15	LBR (Last Branch Record) state	IA32_XSS
16	HWP (Hardware P-state control) state	IA32_XSS
17	AMX tile configuration state: TILECFG	XCR0
18	AMX tile data registers: tmm0-tmm7	XCR0
19	APX extended general-purpose registers: r16-r31	XCR0
20 to 61	(reserved)	
62	Lightweight Profiling (LWP) (AMD only)	XCR0
63	(reserved) (Note: For the XCR0 and IA32_XSS registers, bit 63 is reserved specifically for bit vector expansion - this precludes the existence of a state-component 63.)	

== EAX=12h: SGX Capabilities ==
This leaf provides information about the supported capabilities of the Intel Software Guard Extensions (SGX) feature. The leaf provides multiple sub-leaves, selected with ECX.

Sub-leaf 0 provides information about supported SGX leaf functions in EAX and maximum supported SGX enclave sizes in EDX; ECX is reserved. EBX provides a bitmap of bits that can be set in the MISCSELECT field in the SECS (SGX Enclave Control Structure) - this field is used to control information written to the MISC region of the SSA (SGX Save State Area) when an AEX (SGX Asynchronous Enclave Exit) occurs.

CPUID EAX=12h,ECX=0: SGX leaf functions, MISCSELECT and maximum-sizes
Bit	EAX		EBX		EDX		Bit
Bit	Short	Feature	Short	Feature	Short	Feature	Bit
0	sgx1	SGX1 leaf functions	EXINFO	MISCSELECT: report information about page fault and general protection exception that occurred inside enclave	MaxEnclaveSize_Not64	Log2 of maximum enclave size supported in non-64-bit mode	0
1	sgx2	SGX2 leaf functions	CPINFO	MISCSELECT: report information about control protection exception that occurred inside enclave	MaxEnclaveSize_Not64	Log2 of maximum enclave size supported in non-64-bit mode	1
2	(reserved)		(reserved)		MaxEnclaveSize_Not64	Log2 of maximum enclave size supported in non-64-bit mode	2
3	(reserved)		(reserved)		MaxEnclaveSize_Not64	Log2 of maximum enclave size supported in non-64-bit mode	3
4	(reserved)		(reserved)		MaxEnclaveSize_Not64	Log2 of maximum enclave size supported in non-64-bit mode	4
5	OSS (Note: The SGX Oversubscription Extensions bits (CPUID.(EAX=12h,ECX=0):EAX[bits 5 and 6]) are listed in revisions 065 to 087 of the Intel SDM, but were removed from revision 088 onwards. These bits are known to have been set in at least some IceLake-U processors.)	ENCLV leaves: EINCVIRTCHILD, EDECVIRTCHILD, and ESETCONTEXT	(reserved)		MaxEnclaveSize_Not64	Log2 of maximum enclave size supported in non-64-bit mode	5
6	ENCLS_C	ENCLS leaves: ETRACKC, ERDINFO, ELDBC, ELDUC	(reserved)		MaxEnclaveSize_Not64	Log2 of maximum enclave size supported in non-64-bit mode	6
7	EVERIFYREPORT2	ENCLU leaf: EVERIFYREPORT2	(reserved)		MaxEnclaveSize_Not64	Log2 of maximum enclave size supported in non-64-bit mode	7
8	(reserved)		(reserved)		MaxEnclaveSize_64	Log2 of maximum enclave size supported in 64-bit mode	8
9	(reserved)		(reserved)		MaxEnclaveSize_64	Log2 of maximum enclave size supported in 64-bit mode	9
10	EUPDATESVN	ENCLS leaf: EUPDATESVN	(reserved)		MaxEnclaveSize_64	Log2 of maximum enclave size supported in 64-bit mode	10
11	EDECCSSA	ENCLU leaf: EDECCSSA	(reserved)		MaxEnclaveSize_64	Log2 of maximum enclave size supported in 64-bit mode	11
12	256BITSGX	ENCLU leaf functions EGETKEY256 and EREPORT2	(reserved)		MaxEnclaveSize_64	Log2 of maximum enclave size supported in 64-bit mode	12
13	(reserved)		(reserved)		MaxEnclaveSize_64	Log2 of maximum enclave size supported in 64-bit mode	13
14	(reserved)		(reserved)		MaxEnclaveSize_64	Log2 of maximum enclave size supported in 64-bit mode	14
15	(reserved)		(reserved)		MaxEnclaveSize_64	Log2 of maximum enclave size supported in 64-bit mode	15
31:16	(reserved)		(reserved)		(reserved)		31:16

Sub-leaf 1 provides a bitmap of which bits can be set in the 128-bit ATTRIBUTES field of SECS in EDX:ECX:EBX:EAX (this applies to the SECS copy used as input to the ENCLS[ECREATE] leaf function). The top 64 bits (given in EDX:ECX) are a bitmap of which bits can be set in the XFRM (X-feature request mask) - this mask is a bitmask of which CPU state-components (see leaf 0Dh) will be saved to the SSA in case of an AEX; this has the same layout as the XCR0 control register. The other bits are given in EAX and EBX, as follows:

CPUID EAX=12h,ECX=1: SGX settable bits in SECS.ATTRIBUTES
Bit	EAX		EBX		Bit
Bit	Short	Feature	Short	Feature	Bit
0	(INIT)	(must be 0) (Note: For the copy of the SECS that exists inside an exclave, bit 0 (INIT) of SECS.ATTRIBUTES is used to indicate that the enclave has been initialized with ENCLS[EINIT]. This bit must be 0 in the SECS copy that is given as input to ENCLS[CREATE].)	(reserved)		0
1	DEBUG	Permit debugger to read and write enclave data using EDBGRD and EDBGWR	(reserved)		1
2	MODE64BIT	64-bit-mode enclave	(reserved)		2
3	(reserved)		(reserved)		3
4	PROVISIONKEY	Provisioning key available from EGETKEY	(reserved)		4
5	EINITTOKEN_KEY	EINIT token key available from EGETKEY	(reserved)		5
6	CET	CET (Control-Flow Enforcement Technology) attributes enable	(reserved)		6
7	KSS	Key Separation and Sharing	(reserved)		7
8	(reserved)		(reserved)		8
9	(reserved)		(reserved)		9
10	AEXNOTIFY	Threads inside enclave may receive AEX notifications	(reserved)		10
31:11	(reserved)		(reserved)		31:11

Sub-leaves 2 and up are used to provide information about which physical memory regions are available for use as EPC (Enclave Page Cache) sections under SGX.

CPUID EAX=12h,ECX≥2: SGX Enclave Page Cache section information
Bits	EAX	EBX	ECX	EDX	Bits
3:0	Sub-leaf type: 0000: Invalid; 0001: EPC section; other: reserved	Bits 51:32 of physical base address of EPC section	EPC Section properties: 0000: Invalid; 0001: Has confidentiality, integrity, and replay protection; 0010: Has confidentiality protection only; 0011: Has confidentiality and integrity protection; other: reserved	Bits 51:32 of size of EPC section	3:0
11:4	(reserved)	Bits 51:32 of physical base address of EPC section	(reserved)	Bits 51:32 of size of EPC section	11:4
19:12	Bits 31:12 of physical base address of EPC section	Bits 51:32 of physical base address of EPC section	Bits 31:12 of size of EPC section	Bits 51:32 of size of EPC section	19:12
31:20	Bits 31:12 of physical base address of EPC section	(reserved)	Bits 31:12 of size of EPC section	(reserved)	31:20

== EAX=14h: Processor Trace ==
This leaf provides feature information for Intel Processor Trace (also known as Real Time Instruction Trace).

For sub-leaf 0, the value returned in EAX is the index of the highest sub-leaf supported for CPUID with EAX=14h. EBX and ECX provide feature flags, EDX is reserved.

CPUID EAX=14h,ECX=0: Processor Trace feature bits in EBX and ECX
Bit	EBX		ECX		Bit
Bit	Short	Feature	Short	Feature	Bit
0	cr3_filter	CR3 filtering supported	topaout	ToPA (Table of Physical Addresses) output mechanism for trace packets supported	0
1	cyc_acc	Configurable PSB (Packet Stream Boundary) packet rate and Cycle-Accurate Mode (CYC packets) supported	mentry	ToPA tables can contain hold multiple output entries	1
2	ip_filter	IP filtering, TraceStop filtering and preservation of PT MSRs across warm reset supported	sngl_rng_out	Single-Range Output scheme supported	2
3	mtc	MTC (Mini Time Counter) timing packets supported, and suppression of COFI (Change of Flow Instructions) packets supported.	trace_transport_subsystem	Output to Trace Transport subsystem supported	3
4	ptwrite	PTWRITE instruction supported	(reserved)		4
5	pwr_evt_trace	Power Event Trace supported	(reserved)		5
6	pmi_preserve	Preservation of PSB and PMI (performance monitoring interrupt) supported	(reserved)		6
7	event_trace	Event Trace packet generation supported	(reserved)		7
8	tnt_dis	TNT (Branch Taken-Not-Taken) packet generation disable supported.	(reserved)		8
9	PTTT	PTTT (Processor Trace Trigger Tracing) supported	(reserved)		9
30:10	(reserved)		(reserved)		30:10
31	(reserved)		lip	IP (Instruction Pointer) format for trace packets that contain IP payloads: 0=RIP (effective-address IP); 1=LIP (linear-address IP, with CS base address added)	31

CPUID EAX=14h,ECX=1: Processor Trace packet generation information in EAX, EBX and ECX
Bit	EAX		EBX		ECX		Bit
Bit	Short	Feature	Short	Feature	Short	Feature	Bit
0	rangecnt	Number of configurable address ranges for filtering	cyc_thresholds	Bitmap of supported cycle threshold value encodings	ICNT	Trigger Action EN_ICNT supported	0
1	rangecnt	Number of configurable address ranges for filtering	cyc_thresholds	Bitmap of supported cycle threshold value encodings	TRIGGER_PAUSE	Trigger actions TRACE_PAUSE and TRACE_RESUME supported	1
2	rangecnt	Number of configurable address ranges for filtering	cyc_thresholds	Bitmap of supported cycle threshold value encodings	(reserved)		2
7:3	(reserved)		cyc_thresholds	Bitmap of supported cycle threshold value encodings	(reserved)		7:3
10:8	TRIGGER_CFG_CNT	Number of IA32_RTIT_TRIGGERx_CFG MSRs. (Number of triggers supported is 4x this value)	cyc_thresholds	Bitmap of supported cycle threshold value encodings	(reserved)		10:8
14:11	(reserved)		cyc_thresholds	Bitmap of supported cycle threshold value encodings	(reserved)		14:11
15	(reserved)		cyc_thresholds	Bitmap of supported cycle threshold value encodings	TRIGGER_DR_MATCH	Trigger input DR match supported	15
31:16	mtc_rate	Bitmap of supported MTC period encodings	psb_rate	Bitmap of supported Configurable PSB frequency encodings	(reserved)		31:16

== EAX=15h and EAX=16h: CPU, TSC, Bus and Core Crystal Clock Frequencies ==
These two leaves provide information about various frequencies in the CPU in EAX, EBX and ECX (EDX is reserved in both leaves).

CPUID EAX=15h: TSC and Core Crystal frequency information
EAX	EBX	ECX
Ratio of TSC frequency to Core Crystal Clock frequency, denominator	Ratio of TSC frequency to Core Crystal Clock frequency, numerator (Note: Field not enumerated if zero.)	Core Crystal Clock frequency, in units of Hz

CPUID EAX=16h: Processor and Bus specification frequencies (Note: The frequency values reported by leaf 16h are the processor's specification frequencies - they are constant for the given processor and do not necessarily reflect the actual CPU clock speed at the time CPUID is called.)
Bits	EAX	EBX	ECX	Bits
15:0	Processor Base Frequency (in MHz)	Processor Maximum Frequency (in MHz)	Bus/Reference frequency (in MHz)	15:0
31:16	(reserved)	(reserved)	(reserved)	31:16

If the returned values in EBX and ECX of leaf 15h are both nonzero, then the TSC (Time Stamp Counter) frequency in Hz is given by TSCFreq = ECX*(EBX/EAX).

On some processors (e.g. Intel Skylake), CPUID_15h_ECX is zero but CPUID_16h_EAX is present and not zero. On all known processors where this is the case, the TSC frequency is equal to the Processor Base Frequency, and the Core Crystal Clock Frequency in Hz can be computed as CoreCrystalFreq = (CPUID_16h_EAX * 10000000) * (CPUID_15h_EAX/CPUID_15h_EBX).

On processors that enumerate the TSC/Core Crystal Clock ratio in CPUID leaf 15h, the APIC timer frequency will be the Core Crystal Clock frequency divided by the divisor specified by the APIC's Divide Configuration Register.

== EAX=17h: SoC Vendor Attribute Enumeration ==
This leaf is present in systems where an x86 CPU IP core is implemented in an SoC (System on chip) from another vendor - whereas the other leaves of CPUID provide information about the x86 CPU core, this leaf provides information about the SoC. This leaf takes a sub-leaf index in ECX.

Sub-leaf 0 returns a maximum sub-leaf index in EAX (at least 3), and SoC identification information in EBX/ECX/EDX:

CPUID EAX=17h,ECX=0: SoC identification information
Bit	EBX	ECX	EDX	Bit
15:0	SoC Vendor ID	SoC Project ID	SoC Stepping ID within an SoC project	15:0
16	SoC Vendor ID scheme: 0 : Vendor IDs assigned by Intel (Note: As of May 2024, the following Vendor IDs are known to have been assigned by Intel: ID / Vendor; 1 / Spreadtrum); 1 : Industry standard enumeration scheme (Note: As of May 2024, Intel documentation does not specify which "Industry Standard" enumeration scheme to use for the Vendor ID in EBX[15:0] if EBX[16] is set.)	SoC Project ID	SoC Stepping ID within an SoC project	16
31:17	(reserved)	SoC Project ID	SoC Stepping ID within an SoC project	31:17

Sub-leaves 1 to 3 return a 48-byte SoC vendor brand string in UTF-8 format. Sub-leaf 1 returns the first 16 bytes in EAX,EBX,ECX,EDX (in that order); sub-leaf 2 returns the next 16 bytes and sub-leaf 3 returns the last 16 bytes. The string is allowed but not required to be null-terminated.

== EAX=18h: TLB Hierarchy and Topology ==
This leaf provides information about the TLBs (Translation lookaside buffers) available to the processor core on which the CPUID instruction is run. This leaf provides multiple sub-leaves, selected with ECX.

When invoked with ECX=0, it will return the index of the highest supported sub-leaf in EAX and all-0s in the bottom 5 bits of EDX — the remaining bits of EDX, as well as EBX and ECX, are reserved.

When invoked with ECX≠0, it will return information about a TLB, with ECX (ranging from 1 to the highest supported sub-leaf) selecting which TLB to return information about. The TLBs for a given processor may appear in any order. The returned information for a given TLB includes the number of sets in ECX, as well as additional information in EBX and EDX (EAX is reserved):

CPUID EAX=18h,ECX≠0: TLB Information
Bit	EBX		EDX		Bit
Bit	Short	Feature	Short	Feature	Bit
0	4KB_ENTRIES	TLB supports entries for 4KByte pages	TYPE	TLB Type. The following values are defined: 0: (none) (Note: if EDX[4:0] is returned as 0, then the sub-leaf is considered invalid – it doesn't describe a TLB, and none of the other data returned in EBX, ECX or the remaining bits of EDX are valid. It is possible for a valid sub-leaf to appear after an invalid sub-leaf.); 1: Data TLB; 2: Instruction TLB; 3: Unified (instruction+data) TLB; 4: Load-only data TLB; 5: Store-only data TLB; 6-31: reserved	0
1	2MB_ENTRIES	TLB supports entries for 2MByte hugepages	TYPE	TLB Type. The following values are defined: 0: (none); 1: Data TLB; 2: Instruction TLB; 3: Unified (instruction+data) TLB; 4: Load-only data TLB; 5: Store-only data TLB; 6-31: reserved	1
2	4MB_ENTRIES	TLB supports entries for 4MByte hugepages	TYPE	TLB Type. The following values are defined: 0: (none); 1: Data TLB; 2: Instruction TLB; 3: Unified (instruction+data) TLB; 4: Load-only data TLB; 5: Store-only data TLB; 6-31: reserved	2
3	1GB_ENTRIES	TLB supports entries for 1GByte hugepages	TYPE	TLB Type. The following values are defined: 0: (none); 1: Data TLB; 2: Instruction TLB; 3: Unified (instruction+data) TLB; 4: Load-only data TLB; 5: Store-only data TLB; 6-31: reserved	3
4	(reserved)		TYPE	TLB Type. The following values are defined: 0: (none); 1: Data TLB; 2: Instruction TLB; 3: Unified (instruction+data) TLB; 4: Load-only data TLB; 5: Store-only data TLB; 6-31: reserved	4
7:5	(reserved)		LEVEL_NUM	Translation cache level (starting from 1)	7:5
8	PARTITIONING	TLB partitioning: 0: Soft partitioning between logical processors sharing this TLB; 1-7: reserved	FULLY_ASSOC	Fully-associative TLB	8
10:9	PARTITIONING	TLB partitioning: 0: Soft partitioning between logical processors sharing this TLB; 1-7: reserved	(reserved)		10:9
13:11	(reserved)		(reserved)		13:11
15:14	(reserved)		MAX_LP_ADDRESSABLE_IDS	Maximum number of addressable IDs for logical processors sharing this TLB (minus 1)	15:14
25:16	NUM_WAYS	Number of ways of associativity	MAX_LP_ADDRESSABLE_IDS	Maximum number of addressable IDs for logical processors sharing this TLB (minus 1)	25:16
31:26	NUM_WAYS	Number of ways of associativity	(reserved)		31:26

== EAX=19h: Intel Key Locker Features ==
This leaf provides feature information for Intel Key Locker in EAX, EBX and ECX. EDX is reserved.

CPUID EAX=19h: Key Locker feature bits in EAX, EBX and ECX
Bit	EAX		EBX		ECX		Bit
Bit	Short	Feature	Short	Feature	Short	Feature	Bit
0	cpl0_restrict	Key Locker restriction of CPL0-only supported	aes_kle	AES "Key Locker" Instructions enabled	nobackup	No-backup parameter to LOADIWKEY supported	0
1	no_encrypt_restrict	Key Locker restriction of no-encrypt supported	(reserved)		rand_iwkey	KeySource encoding of 1 (randomization of internal wrapping key) supported	1
2	no_decrypt_restrict	Key Locker restriction of no-decrypt supported	aes_wide_kl	AES "Wide Key Locker" Instructions supported	(reserved)		2
3		(Process Restriction) (Note: As of April 2024, the "Process Restriction" bit is listed only in Intel TDX documentation and is not set in any known processor.)	(reserved)		(reserved)		3
4	(reserved)		iwkeybackup	"Key Locker" MSRs and backup of internal wrapping key supported	(reserved)		4
31:5	(reserved)		(reserved)		(reserved)		31:5

== EAX=1Dh: Intel AMX Tile Information ==
When ECX=0, the highest supported "palette" subleaf is enumerated in EAX. When ECX≥1, information on palette n is returned.

Properly written software must query the reported tile register count and the reported tile sizes and dimensions, instead of assuming a count of 8, or 16 rows, or 64 bytes per row, or the corresponding 1024 and 8192 bytes. For example, a processor may actually provide 8 or 16 or 32 tiles. Note that an 8-tile or a 16-tile implementation can be handled with a 64-byte TILECFG register, but that a 32-tile implementation requires a >64-byte TILECFG register. Also note that a 32-tile implementation must implement EVEX-encoded variants of AMX instructions, so that registers TMM16...TMM31 can be referenced.

CPUID EAX=1Dh,ECX≥1: AMX Tile Palette n Information
Bits	EAX		EBX		ECX		EDX		Bits
Bits	Short	Feature	Short	Feature	Short	Feature	Short	Feature	Bits
15:0	total_tile_bytes	Size of all tile registers, in bytes (8192)	bytes_per_row	(64)	max_rows	(16)	(reserved)		15:0
31:16	bytes_per_tile	Size of one tile, in bytes (1024)	max_names	Number of tile registers (8)	(reserved)		(reserved)		31:16

== EAX=1Eh: Intel AMX Tile Multiplier (TMUL) Information ==
This leaf returns information on the AMX TMUL (tile multiplier) unit. The leaf provides multiple sub-leaves, selected with ECX.

Subleaf 0 returns maximum supported sub-leaf in EAX and basic TMUL information in EBX; subleaf 1 returns additional feature information in EAX.

CPUID EAX=1Eh,ECX=0: AMX TMUL Information Main Leaf
Bits	EBX		ECX		EDX		Bits
Bits	Short	Feature	Short	Feature	Short	Feature	Bits
7:0	tmul_maxk	Maximum number of rows or columns (16)	(reserved)		(reserved)		7:0
23:8	tmul_maxn	Maximum number of bytes per column (64)	(reserved)		(reserved)		23:8
31:24	(reserved)		(reserved)		(reserved)		31:24

CPUID EAX=1Eh,ECX=1: AMX TMUL feature information
Bits	EAX		EBX		ECX		EDX		Bits
Bits	Short	Feature	Short	Feature	Short	Feature	Short	Feature	Bits
0	amx-int8	8-bit integer support	(reserved)		(reserved)		(reserved)		0
1	amx-bf16	bfloat16 support	(reserved)		(reserved)		(reserved)		1
2	amx-complex	Complex number support	(reserved)		(reserved)		(reserved)		2
3	amx-fp16	float16 support	(reserved)		(reserved)		(reserved)		3
4	amx-fp8	float8 support	(reserved)		(reserved)		(reserved)		4
5	(amx-transpose) (Note: The amx-transpose and amx-tf32 extensions were introduced in Intel ISE rev 054 but were removed in later revisions (rev 059 for amx-transpose and rev 062 for amx-tf32) and never shipped in any Intel CPU - both of them are, however, reported to have shipped in a non-Intel CPU.)	Transposition support	(reserved)		(reserved)		(reserved)		5
6	(amx-tf32)	TensorFloat-32 ("FP19") support	(reserved)		(reserved)		(reserved)		6
7	amx-avx512	AMX-AVX512 support	(reserved)		(reserved)		(reserved)		7
8	amx-movrs	AMX-MOVRS support	(reserved)		(reserved)		(reserved)		8
31:9	(reserved)		(reserved)		(reserved)		(reserved)		31:9

== EAX=21h: Reserved for TDX enumeration ==
When Intel TDX (Trust Domain Extensions) is active, attempts to execute the CPUID instruction by a TD (Trust Domain) guest will be intercepted by the TDX module. This module will, when CPUID is invoked with EAX=21h and ECX=0 (leaf 21h, sub-leaf 0), return the index of the highest supported sub-leaf for leaf 21h in EAX and a TDX module vendor ID string as a 12-byte ASCII string in EBX,EDX,ECX (in that order). Intel's own module implementation returns the vendor ID string "IntelTDX " (with four trailing spaces) - for this module, additional feature information is not available through CPUID and must instead be obtained through the TDX-specific TDCALL instruction.

This leaf is reserved in hardware and will (on processors whose highest basic leaf is 21h or higher) return 0 in EAX/EBX/ECX/EDX when run directly on the CPU.

== EAX=24h, ECX=0: AVX10 Converged Vector ISA ==
This returns a maximum supported sub-leaf in EAX and AVX10 feature information in EBX. (ECX and EDX are reserved.)

CPUID EAX=24h, ECX=0: AVX10 feature bits in EBX
Bit	EBX	
Bit	Short	Feature
7:0	vector_isa_version	AVX10 Converged Vector ISA version (≥1)
15:8	(reserved)	
18:16	(reserved as 111b) (Note: These three bits were originally designed to indicate the "supported vector width", with bit 16 indicating 128-bit vector support, bit 17 for 256-bit, and bit 18 for 512-bit. 128-bit maximum CPUs were said to have "AVX10/128" support, 256-bit maximum to have "AVX10/256" support, and 512-bit maximum to have "AVX10/512" support; The number after the slash indicated the maximum supported vector width. Shortly after the announcement of AVX10.1, Intel dropped plans for AVX10/128, likely after pushback from developers, leaving only 256-bit and 512-bit maximum vector widths as supported. With AVX10.2, Intel dropped the vector width distinction entirely, instead mandating 512-bit vector support. As the only shipping AVX10.1 CPUs were based on Granite Rapids, a P-core-only design (and subsequently has had AVX10/512), no AVX10/256 CPUs were ever shipped. In other words, the only shipped CPUs with AVX10 had 128-, 256-, and 512-bit support, putting all three bits as 111b. These bits are now documented as reserved, but reading 111b.)	
31:19	(reserved)	

== EAX=24h, ECX=1: Discrete AVX10 Features ==
Subleaf 1 is reserved for AVX10 features not bound to a version.

CPUID EAX=24h, ECX=1: Discrete AVX10 features in ECX
Bit	ECX	
Bit	Short	Feature
0	(VPMM)	(Vector-Extension Packed Matrix Multiplication)
1	AVX10_BMM	AVX10 BMM instructions
2	AVX10_VNNI_INT	AVX10.2 VNNI instructions (Note: The AVX10.2 VNNI instructions are present if either the AVX10 version is 2 or higher (see CPUID.(EAX=24h).EBX[7:0]) or the AVX10_VNNI_INT bit is set.)
3	AVX10_V2_AUX	AVX10.2 auxiliary instructions
4	(reserved)	
5	(reserved)	
6	(reserved)	
7	AVX10_VPMLDSABFLYDQ	AVX10 Vector Packed ML-DSA Butterfly Dword-Qword instruction
31:8	(reserved)	

== EAX=2000'0000h: Highest Xeon Phi Function Implemented ==
The highest function is returned in EAX. This leaf is only present on Xeon Phi processors.

== EAX=2000'0001h: Xeon Phi Feature Bits ==
This function returns feature flags.

CPUID EAX=2000'0001h: Xeon Phi feature bits
Bit	EAX		EBX		ECX		EDX		Bit
Bit	Short	Feature	Short	Feature	Short	Feature	Short	Feature	Bit
0	(reserved)		(reserved)		(reserved)		(reserved)		0
1	(reserved)		(reserved)		(reserved)		L1OM	L1OM	1
2	(reserved)		(reserved)		(reserved)		L1OM_D6_EN		2
3	(reserved)		(reserved)		(reserved)		L1OM_62_EN		3
4	(reserved)		(reserved)		(reserved)		K1OM	K1OM	4
31:5	(reserved)		(reserved)		(reserved)		(reserved)		31:5

== EAX=4000'0000h-4FFFF'FFFh: Reserved for Hypervisors ==
When the CPUID instruction is executed under Intel VT-x or AMD-v virtualization, it will be intercepted by the hypervisor, enabling the hypervisor to return CPUID feature flags that differ from those of the underlying hardware. CPUID leaves 40000000h to 4FFFFFFFh are not implemented in hardware, and are reserved for use by hypervisors to provide hypervisor-specific identification and feature information through this interception mechanism.

For leaf 40000000h, the hypervisor is expected to return the index of the highest supported hypervisor CPUID leaf in EAX, and a 12-character hypervisor ID string in EBX,ECX,EDX (in that order). For leaf 40000001h, the hypervisor may return an interface identification signature in EAX - e.g. hypervisors that wish to advertise that they are Hyper-V compatible may return 0x31237648—"Hv#1" in EAX. The formats of leaves 40000001h and up to the highest supported leaf are otherwise hypervisor-specific. Hypervisors that implement these leaves will normally also set bit 31 of ECX for CPUID leaf 1 to indicate their presence.

Hypervisors that expose more than one hypervisor interface may provide additional sets of CPUID leaves for the additional interfaces, at a spacing of 100h leaves per interface. Examples of hypervisors that do this include:

- When QEMU is configured to provide both Hyper-V and KVM interfaces, it will provide Hyper-V information starting from CPUID leaf 40000000h and KVM information starting from leaf 40000100h.
- When Xen is configured to provide Hyper-V emulation, it will provide Hyper-V information starting from CPUID leaf 40000000h and Xen information starting from leaf 40000100h.

Some hypervisors that are known to return a hypervisor ID string in leaf 40000000h include:

CPUID EAX=4000'0000h: 12-character Hypervisor ID string in EBX,ECX,EDX
Hypervisor	ID String (ASCII)	Notes
Microsoft Hyper-V	"Microsoft Hv"	
Linux KVM	"KVMKVMKVM\0\0\0"	\0 denotes an ASCII NUL character.
Linux KVM	"Linux KVM Hv"	Hyper-V emulation
bhyve	"BHyVE BHyVE ", "bhyve bhyve "	ID string changed from mixed-case to lower-case in 2013. Lower-case string also used in bhyve-derived hypervisors such as xhyve and HyperKit.
Xen	"XenVMMXenVMM"	Only when using HVM (hardware virtual machine) mode.
QEMU	"TCGTCGTCGTCG"	Only when the TCG (Tiny Code Generator) is enabled.
Parallels	"prl hyperv ", " lrpepyh vr"	The " lrpepyh vr" string is an endianness-swapped version of the "prl hyperv " string, observed in some versions of Parallels Workstation.
VMware	"VMwareVMware"	
Project ACRN	"ACRNACRNACRN"	
VirtualBox	"VBoxVBoxVBox"	Only when configured to use the "hyperv" paravirtualization provider.
QNX Hypervisor	"QXNQSBMV"	The QNX hypervisor detection method provided in the official QNX documentation checks only the first 8 characters of the string, as provided in EBX and ECX (including an endianness swap) - EDX is ignored and may take any value.
NetBSD NVMM	"___ NVMM ___"	
OpenBSD VMM	"OpenBSDVMM58"	
Siemens Jailhouse	"Jailhouse\0\0\0"	\0 denotes an ASCII NUL character.
Bitdefender Napoca	"Napocahv "	
FEX-Emu	"FEXIFEXIEMU\0"	\0 denotes an ASCII NUL character.
Intel HAXM	"HAXMHAXMHAXM"	Project discontinued.
Intel KGT (Trusty)	"EVMMEVMMEVMM"	On "trusty" branch of KGT only, which is used for the Intel x86 Architecture Distribution of Trusty OS (archive) (KGT also returns a signature in CPUID leaf 3: ECX=0x4D4D5645 "EVMM" and EDX=0x43544E49 "INTC")
Unisys s-Par	"UnisysSpar64"	
Lockheed Martin LMHS	"SRESRESRESRE"	

== EAX=8000'0000h: Highest Extended Function Implemented ==
The highest calling parameter is returned in EAX.

EBX/ECX/EDX return the manufacturer ID string (same as EAX=0) on AMD but not Intel CPUs.

== EAX=8000'0001h: Extended Processor Info and Feature Bits ==
This returns extended feature flags in EDX and ECX. On AMD processors, it also returns a CPU signature in EAX, and a brand identifier in EBX.

The signature returned in EAX is, for most AMD processors, the same as the one returned in EAX for the EAX=1 leaf. (The exceptions to this are the AMD K6 and AMD K7 processor families, where the "Family" part of the signature differs between leaf 1 and leaf 80000001: leaf 1 returns 5 for K6 and 6 for K7, while leaf 80000001 returns 6 for K6 and 7 for K7.)

Many of the bits in EDX (bits 0 through 9, 12 through 17, 23, and 24) are duplicates of EDX from the EAX=1 leaf - these bits are highlighted in light yellow. (These duplicated bits are present on AMD but not Intel CPUs.)

AMD feature flags in EDX and ECX are as follows:

CPUID EAX=8000'0001h: Feature bits in EDX and ECX
Bit	EDX		ECX		Bit
Bit	Short	Feature	Short	Feature	Bit
0	fpu	Onboard x87 FPU	lahf_lm	LAHF/SAHF in long mode	0
1	vme	Virtual mode extensions (VIF)	cmp_legacy	Hyperthreading not valid	1
2	de	Debugging extensions (CR4 bit 3)	svm	Secure Virtual Machine	2
3	pse	Page Size Extension	extapic	Extended APIC space	3
4	tsc	Time Stamp Counter	cr8_legacy	CR8 in 32-bit mode	4
5	msr	Model-specific registers	abm/lzcnt	Advanced bit manipulation (LZCNT and POPCNT)	5
6	pae	Physical Address Extension	sse4a	SSE4a	6
7	mce	Machine Check Exception	misalignsse	Misaligned SSE mode	7
8	cx8	CMPXCHG8B (compare-and-swap) instruction	3dnowprefetch	PREFETCH and PREFETCHW instructions	8
9	apic	Onboard Advanced Programmable Interrupt Controller	osvw	OS Visible Workaround	9
10	(syscall) (Note: The use of EDX bit 10 to indicate support for SYSCALL/SYSRET is only valid on AuthenticAMD Family 5 Model 7 CPUs (AMD K6, 250nm "Little Foot") — for all other processors, EDX bit 11 should be used instead. These instructions were first introduced on Model 7 — the CPUID bit to indicate their support was moved to EDX bit 11 from Model 8 (AMD K6-2) onwards. The version of SYSCALL present in Model 7 (indicated by EDX bit 10) is not fully compatible with the version of SYSCALL present in Model 8 and later CPUs (indicated by EDX bit 11) in later processors (the Model 7 version doesn't allow IRET after SYSCALL while later versions do).)	(SYSCALL/SYSRET, K6 only)	ibs	Instruction Based Sampling	10
11	syscall (Note: On Intel CPUs, the CPUID bit for SYSCALL/SYSRET is only set if the CPUID instruction is executed in 64-bit mode.)	SYSCALL and SYSRET instructions	xop (Note: AMD's initial proposal for the SSE5 instruction set extension listed ECX bit 11 as the feature bit for SSE5. When AMD abandoned its SSE5 proposal in favour of XOP, ECX bit 11 was repurposed as the feature bit for XOP.)	XOP instruction set	11
12	mtrr	Memory Type Range Registers	skinit	SKINIT and STGI instructions	12
13	pge	Page Global Enable bit in CR4	wdt	Watchdog timer	13
14	mca	Machine check architecture	(tbm0)	(TBM0 instruction support) (Note: ECX bit 14 (as TBM0) is listed as by sandpile.org and is recognized by HWiNFO 8.24, but is not set in any known processor nor listed in any known public AMD documentation. The TBM0 instruction encodings are also listed by sandpile.org.)	14
15	cmov	Conditional move and FCMOV instructions	lwp	Lightweight Profiling	15
16	pat (Note: On some processors − Cyrix MediaGXm, several Geodes (NatSemi Geode GXm, GXLV, GX1; AMD Geode GX1) and Transmeta Crusoe (CyrixInstead/Geode by NSC/GenuineTMx86, all Family 5 Model 4) — EDX bits 16 and 24 have a different meaning: Bit 16: Floating-point Conditional Move (FCMOV) supported; Bit 24: Cyrix EMMI (extended MMX) instructions supported. (The EMMI instructions are also present on CyrixInstead Family 6 processors, such as the 6x86MX and MII, even though they don't set this bit.))	Page Attribute Table	fma4	4-operand fused multiply-add instructions	16
17	pse36	36-bit page size extension	tce	Translation Cache Extension	17
18	(ecc)	(Processor supports ECC; K7 only) (Note: EDX bit 18 is set in some AMD Athlon "Thunderbird" and Duron "Spitfire"/"Morgan" models, but not listed in any public AMD documentation. Sandpile.org describes the bit as an ECC feature bit.)	(cvt16)	(XOP-prefix forms of the FP16↔FP32 conversion instructions VCVTPS2PH and VCVTPH2PS) (Note: ECX bit 18 was listed as CVT16 in revision 3.03 of AMD APM vol6, but was removed from revision 3.04 and later. It is not set in any known CPU. The Intel F16C extension (indicated by CPUID.(EAX=1):ECX[29]), which defines VEX-encoded forms of these instructions, was later adopted by both Intel and AMD.)	18
19	ecc	"Athlon MP" / "Sempron" CPU brand identification (Note: EDX bit 19 is used for CPU brand identification on AuthenticAMD Family 6 processors only - the bit is, combined with processor signature and FSB speed, used to identify processors as either multiprocessor-capable or carrying the Sempron brand name.)	nodeid_msr	NodeID MSR (C001_100C)	19
20	nx	NX bit (page-table no-execute bit)	(reserved)		20
21	(sem)	Secure Execution Mode (Note: "SEM" is listed as a CPUID extended feature bit in AMD SimNow documentation with no further description given. The bit is not set in any known processor, nor is it emulated by SimNow. According to Sandpile, this evolved into SVM.)	tbm	Trailing Bit Manipulation	21
22	mmxext	Extended MMX (non-XMM subset of SSE1)	topoext	Topology Extensions (CPUID leaves 80000001D and 80000001E)	22
23	mmx	MMX instructions	perfctr_core	Core performance counter extensions	23
24	fxsr	FXSAVE, FXRSTOR instructions, CR4 bit 9	perfctr_nb	Northbridge performance counter extensions	24
25	fxsr_opt	FXSAVE/FXRSTOR optimizations	(StreamPerfMon)	(Streaming performance monitor architecture) (Note: ECX bit 25 is listed as StreamPerfMon in revision 3.20 of AMD APM only - it is listed as reserved in later revisions. The bit is set on Excavator and Steamroller CPUs only.)	25
26	pdpe1gb	Gibibyte pages	dbx	Data breakpoint extensions	26
27	rdtscp	RDTSCP instruction	perftsc	Performance timestamp counter (PTSC)	27
28	(rex32) (Note: In addition to being used as a REX32 feature bit on some AMD K8 processors, EDX bit 28 is also set on some VIA Nehemiah processors for unknown purpose.)	(REX prefix available in 32-bit mode; early K8 only) (Note: The REX32 feature is listed by sandpile.org and is described in an old patent. It is not listed in any known public AMD documentation, and is present in early versions of AMD K8 only.)	pcx_l2i/ pcx_l3	AMD Fam 15h/16h (Jaguar/Puma): L2I perf counter extensions; AMD Fam ≥17h (Zen): L3 perf counter extensions	28
29	lm	Long mode (x86-64)	monitorx	MONITORX and MWAITX instructions	29
30	3dnowext	Extended 3DNow!	addr_mask_ext	Address mask extension to 32 bits for instruction breakpoints	30
31	3dnow	3DNow!	(reserved) (Note: ECX bit 31 is not listed in any known public AMD documentation, but has been observed to be set on AMD 4700S Desktop Kit.)		31

== EAX=8000'0002h,8000'0003h,8000'0004h: Processor Brand String ==
These return the processor brand string in EAX, EBX, ECX and EDX. CPUID must be issued with each parameter in sequence to get the entire 48-byte ASCII processor brand string. It is necessary to check whether the feature is present in the CPU by issuing CPUID with EAX = 80000000h first and checking if the returned value is not less than 80000004h.

The string is specified in Intel/AMD documentation to be null-terminated, however this is not always the case (e.g. DM&P Vortex86DX3 and AMD Ryzen 7 6800HS are known to return non-null-terminated brand strings in leaves 80000002h-80000004h), and software should not rely on it.

#include <stdio.h>
#include <string.h>
#include <cpuid.h>

int main()
{
    unsigned int regs[12];
    char str[sizeof(regs)+1];

    __cpuid(0x80000000, regs[0], regs[1], regs[2], regs[3]);

    if (regs[0] < 0x80000004)
        return 1;

    __cpuid(0x80000002, regs[0], regs[1], regs[2], regs[3]);
    __cpuid(0x80000003, regs[4], regs[5], regs[6], regs[7]);
    __cpuid(0x80000004, regs[8], regs[9], regs[10], regs[11]);

    memcpy(str, regs, sizeof(regs));
    str[sizeof(regs)] = '\0';
    printf("%s\n", str);

    return 0;
}

On AMD processors, from 180nm Athlon onwards (AuthenticAMD Family 6 Model 2 and later), it is possible to modify the processor brand string returned by CPUID leaves 80000002h-80000004h by using the WRMSR instruction to write a 48-byte replacement string to MSRs C0010030h-C0010035h. This can also be done on AMD Geode GX/LX, albeit using MSRs 300Ah-300Fh.

The string returned by CPUID leaves 80000002h-80000004h frequently contains multiple leading, trailing or middle spaces — a few examples of Processor Brand Strings with many consecutive spaces that have appeared in Intel/AMD CPUs include:

- Intel(R) Core(TM) i7-3960X CPU @ 3.30GHz
- Intel(R) Xeon(R) CPU W3670 @ 3.20GHz
- AMD EPYC 9655 96-Core Processor

In some cases, determining the CPU vendor requires examining not just the Vendor ID in CPUID leaf 0 and the CPU signature in leaf 1, but also the Processor Brand String in leaves 80000002h-80000004h. Known cases include:

- Montage Jintide CPUs can be distinguished from the Intel Xeon CPU models they're based on by the presence of the substring Montage in the brand string of the Montage CPUs (e.g. Montage Jintide C2460 and Intel Xeon Platinum 8160 - both of which identify themselves as GenuineIntel Family 6 Model 55h Stepping 4 - can be distinguished in this manner.)
- CentaurHauls Family 6 CPUs may be either VIA or Zhaoxin CPUs - these can be distinguished by the presence of the substring ZHAOXIN in the brand string of the Zhaoxin CPUs (e.g. Zhaoxin KaiXian ZX-C+ C4580 and VIA Eden X4 C4250 - both of which identify themselves as CentaurHauls Family 6 Model 0Fh Stepping 0Eh - can be distinguished in this manner.)
- Apple's Rosetta 2 x86 emulator — which identifies itself as GenuineIntel Family 6 — can be distinguished from the Intel Xeon processor it is emulating by the presence of the substring VirtualApple in the brand string of Rosetta 2.
- Microsoft's x86-on-ARM emulator — which, in 64-bit mode, identifies itself as AuthenticAMD Family 0Fh — can be distinguished from the AMD processor it is emulating by the presence of the substring Virtual CPU in the emulator's brand string.

== EAX=8000'0005h: L1 Cache and TLB Identifiers ==
This provides information about the processor's level-1 cache and TLB characteristics in EAX, EBX, ECX and EDX as follows: (Note: On some older Cyrix and Geode CPUs (specifically, CyrixInstead/Geode by NSC Family 5 Model 4 CPUs only), leaf 80000005h exists but has a completely different format, similar to that of leaf 2.)

- EAX: information about L1 hugepage TLBs (TLBs that hold entries corresponding to 2M/4M pages) (Note: On processors that can only handle small-pages in their TLBs, this leaf will return 0 in EAX. (On such processors, which include e.g. AMD K6 and Transmeta Crusoe, hugepage entries in the page-tables are broken up into 4K pages as needed upon entry into the TLB.) On some processors, e.g. VIA Cyrix III "Samuel", this leaf returns 0x80000005 in EAX. This has the same meaning as EAX=0, i.e. no hugepage TLBs.)
- EBX: information about L1 small-page TLBs (TLBs that hold entries corresponding to 4K pages)
- ECX: information about L1 data cache
- EDX: information about L1 instruction cache

CPUID EAX=8000'0005h: L1 Cache/TLB information in EAX,EBX,ECX,EDX
Bits	EAX	EBX	ECX	EDX	Bits
7:0	Number of instruction TLB entries (Note: On Transmeta CPUs, the value FFh is used to indicate a 256-entry TLB.)		Cache line size in bytes		7:0
15:8	instruction TLB associativity (Note: For the associativity fields of leaf 80000005h, the following values are used: Value / Meaning; 0 / (reserved); 1 / Direct-mapped; 2 to FEh / N-way set-associative (field encodes N); FFh / Fully-associative)		Number of cache lines per tag		15:8
23:16	Number of data TLB entries		Cache associativity		23:16
31:24	Data TLB associativity		Cache size in kibibytes		31:24

== EAX=8000'0006h: Extended L2 Cache Features ==
Returns details of the L2 cache in ECX, including the line size in bytes (Bits 07 - 00), type of associativity (encoded by a 4 bits field; Bits 15 - 12) and the cache size in KiB (Bits 31 - 16).

#include <stdio.h>
#include <cpuid.h>

int main()
{
    unsigned int eax, ebx, ecx, edx;
    unsigned int lsize, assoc, cache;

    __cpuid(0x80000006, eax, ebx, ecx, edx);
    
    lsize = ecx & 0xff;
    assoc = (ecx >> 12) & 0x0f;
    cache = (ecx >> 16) & 0xffff;

    printf("Line size: %d B, Assoc. type: %d, Cache size: %d KiB.\n", lsize, assoc, cache);

    return 0;
}

== EAX=8000'0007h: Processor Power Management Information and RAS Capabilities ==
This function provides information about power management, power reporting and RAS (Reliability, availability and serviceability) capabilities of the CPU.

CPUID EAX=8000'0007h: RAS features in EBX and power management features in EDX
Bit	EBX		EDX		Bit
Bit	Short	Feature	Short	Feature	Bit
0	MCAOverflowRecov	MCA (Machine Check Architecture) overflow recovery support	TS	Temperature Sensor	0
1	SUCCOR	Software uncorrectable error containment and recovery capability	FID	Frequency ID Control	1
2	HWA	Hardware assert support (MSRs C001_10C0 to C001_10DF)	VID	Voltage ID Control	2
3	ScalableMca	Scalable MCA supported	TTP	THERMTRIP	3
4	PFEH	Platform First Error Handling	TM	Hardware thermal control (HTC) supported	4
5	LWSMI	Lightweight SMI	STC	Software thermal control (STC) supported	5
6	(reserved)		100MHzSteps	100 MHz multiplier control	6
7	(reserved)		HwPstate	Hardware P-state control (MSRs C001_0061 to C001_0063)	7
8	(reserved)		TscInvariant	Invariant TSC — TSC (Time Stamp Counter) rate is guaranteed to be invariant across all P-states, C-states, and stop grant transitions.	8
9	(reserved)		CPB	Core Performance Boost	9
10	(reserved)		EffFreqRO	Read-only effective frequency interface (MSRs C000_00E7 and C000_00E8)	10
11	(reserved)		ProcFeedbackInterface	Processor Feedback Interface supported	11
12	(reserved)		ProcPowerReporting	Processor power reporting interface supported	12
13	(reserved)		ConnectedStandby	Connected Standby	13
14	(reserved)		RAPL	Running Average Power Limit	14
15	MCA_QUERY_MSR		FastCPPC	Fast CPPC (Collaborative Processor Performance Control) supported	15
16	(reserved)		CppcPerfPriority	CPPC Performance Priority	16
26:17	(reserved)		(reserved)		26:17
27	(reserved)		(reserved) (Note: Revision 1.00 of AMD's CPPC Performance Priority specification listed the feature as being indicated by bit 27 of EDX - this was corrected to bit 16 in later revisions.)		27
31:28	(reserved)		(reserved)		31:28

CPUID EAX=8000'0007h: Processor Feedback info in EAX and power monitoring interface info in ECX
Bits	EAX		ECX		Bits
Bits	Short	Feature	Short	Feature	Bits
7:0	NumberOfMonitors	Number of Processor Feedback MSR pairs available, starting from MSR C001_0080 onwards	CpuPwrSampleTimeRatio	Ratio of compute unit power accumulator sample period to TSC counter period.	7:0
15:8	Version	Processor Feedback Capabilities version	CpuPwrSampleTimeRatio	Ratio of compute unit power accumulator sample period to TSC counter period.	15:8
31:16	MaxWrapTime	Maximum time between reads (in milliseconds) that software should use to avoid two wraps.	CpuPwrSampleTimeRatio	Ratio of compute unit power accumulator sample period to TSC counter period.	31:16

== EAX=8000'0008h: Virtual and Physical Address Sizes ==
CPUID EAX=8000'0008h: Feature bits in EBX
Bit	EBX	
Bit	Short	Feature
0	clzero	CLZERO instruction
1	retired_instr	Retired instruction count MSR (C000_00E9h) supported
2	xrstor_fp_err	XRSTOR restores FP errors
3	invlpgb	INVLPGB and TLBSYNC instructions
4	rdpru	RDPRU instruction
5	(xotext)	(PlayStation 5: Execute-Only Memory) (Note: As of June 2025, bits 5, 7, and 11 of CPUID.(EAX=8000_0008):EBX are not listed in any known public AMD documentation, but have been observed to be set on AMD 4700S Desktop Kit processors.)
6	mbe	Memory Bandwidth Enforcement
7	(reserved)	
8	mcommit	MCOMMIT instruction
9	wbnoinvd	WBNOINVD instruction
10	LBR_EXT_V1	LBR extensions v1
11	(reserved)	
12	IBPB	Indirect Branch Prediction Barrier (performed by writing 1 to bit 0 of PRED_CMD (MSR 049h))
13	wbinvd_int	WBINVD and WBNOINVD are interruptible
14	IBRS	Indirect Branch Restricted Speculation
15	STIBP	Single Thread Indirect Branch Prediction mode
16	IbrsAlwaysOn	IBRS mode has enhanced performance and should be left always on
17	StibpAlwaysOn	STIBP mode has enhanced performance and should be left always on
18	ibrs_preferred	IBRS preferred over software
19	ibrs_same_mode_protection	IBRS provides Same Mode Protection
20	no_efer_lmsle	EFER.LMSLE is unsupported (Note: The LMSLE (Long Mode Segment Limit Enable) feature does not have its own CPUID flag and is detected by checking CPU family and model. It was introduced in AuthenticAMD Family 0Fh Model 14h (90nm Athlon64/Opteron) CPUs and is present in all later AMD CPUs - except the ones with the 'no_efer_lmsle' flag set.)
21	invlpgb_nested	INVLPGB support for nested pages
22	(LBR_TSX)	(LBR TSX info)
23	ppin	Protected Processor Inventory Number - PPIN_CTL (C001_02F0) and PPIN (C001_02F1) MSRs are present
24	ssbd	Speculative Store Bypass Disable
25	ssbd_legacy	Speculative Store Bypass Disable Legacy
26	ssbd_no	Speculative Store Bypass Disable Not Required
27	cppc	Collaborative Processor Performance Control
28	psfd	Predictive Store Forward Disable
29	btc_no	Branch Type Confusion: Processor not affected
30	IBPB_RET	IBPB (see bit 12) also clears return address predictor
31	branch_sampling	Branch Sampling Support

CPUID EAX=8000'0008h: Size and range fields in EAX, ECX, EDX
Bits	EAX	ECX	EDX	Bits
7:0	Number of Physical Address Bits	Number of Physical Threads in processor (minus 1)	Maximum page count for INVLPGB instruction	7:0
11:8	Number of Linear Address Bits	(reserved)	Maximum page count for INVLPGB instruction	11:8
15:12	Number of Linear Address Bits	APIC ID Size	Maximum page count for INVLPGB instruction	15:12
17:16	Guest Physical Address Size (Note: A value of 0 indicates that the "Guest Physical Address Size" is the same as the "Number Of Physical Address Bits", specified in EAX[7:0].)	Performance Timestamp Counter size	Maximum ECX value recognized by RDPRU instruction	17:16
23:18	Guest Physical Address Size	(reserved)	Maximum ECX value recognized by RDPRU instruction	23:18
31:24	(reserved)	(reserved)	Maximum ECX value recognized by RDPRU instruction	31:24

== EAX=8000'000Ah: SVM features ==
This leaf returns information about AMD SVM (Secure Virtual Machine) features in EAX, EBX, ECX and EDX.

CPUID EAX=8000'000Ah: SVM information in EAX and EBX
Bits	EAX	EBX	Bits
7:0	SVM Revision Number	Number of available ASIDs (address space identifiers)	7:0
13:8	Maximum Guest Alternate Address Translation Prefix Width (Note: Early revisions of AMD's "Pacifica" documentation listed EAX bit 8 as an always-zero-in-hardware bit reserved for hypervisor use. Later AMD documentation, such as #25481 "CPUID specification" rev 2.18 and later, only lists the bit as reserved. In rev 2.30 and later, a different bit is listed as reserved for hypervisor use: CPUID.(EAX=1):ECX[bit 31]. Starting with Zen 6, bit 8 has been repurposed as part of the new "MaxGaatPrefixWidth" field.)	Number of available ASIDs (address space identifiers)	13:8
31:14	(reserved)	Number of available ASIDs (address space identifiers)	31:14

CPUID EAX=8000'000Ah: SVM feature flags in EDX and ECX
Bit	EDX		ECX		Bit
Bit	Short	Feature	Short	Feature	Bit
0	NP	Rapid Virtualization Indexing (Nested Paging)	GAAT	Guest Alternate Address Translation supported	0
1	LbrVirt	LBR (Last Branch Records) virtualization	PW	Paging-Write supported	1
2	SVML	SVM-Lock	VPW	Verify Paging-Write supported	2
3	NRIPS	nRIP (next sequential instruction pointer) save on #VMEXIT supported	GuestPmcFiltering	Guest PMC Event Filtering	3
4	TscRateMsr	MSR-based TSC rate control (MSR C000_0104h)	PML	Page Modification Logging	4
5	VmcbClean	VMCB (Virtual Machine Control Block) clean bits supported	EnhancedTlbi	INVLPGB and TLBSYNC instructions support IOMMU invalidate.	5
6	FlushByAsid	TLB flush events (e.g. CR3 writes, CR4.PGE toggles) only flush the TLB entries of the current ASID (address space ID)	x2AVIC_EXT	4096 vCPUs supported in x2AVIC mode	6
7	DecodeAssist	Decode assists supported	(reserved)		7
8	PmcVirt	PMC (Performance Monitoring Counters) virtualization	(reserved)		8
9	(SseIsa10Compat) (Note: EDX bit 9 is briefly listed in some older revisions of AMD's document #25481 "CPUID Specification", and is set only in some AMD Bobcat CPUs. Rev 2.28 of #25481 lists the bit as "Ssse3Sse5Dis" - in rev 2.34, it is listed as having been removed from the spec at rev 2.32 under the name "SseIsa10Compat".)	(reserved)	(reserved)		9
10	PauseFilter	PAUSE intercept filter supported	(reserved)		10
11	EMP	Encrypted Microcode Patch	(reserved)		11
12	PauseFilterThreshold	PAUSE filter cycle count threshold supported	(reserved)		12
13	AVIC	AMD Advanced Virtualized Interrupt Controller supported	(reserved)		13
14	(reserved)		(reserved)		14
15	VMSAVEvirt	VMSAVE and VMLOAD virtualization	(reserved)		15
16	VGIF	Global Interrupt Flag (GIF) virtualization	(reserved)		16
17	GMET	Guest Mode Execution Trap	(reserved)		17
18	x2AVIC	x2APIC mode supported for AVIC	(reserved)		18
19	SSSCheck	SVM Supervisor shadow stack restrictions	(reserved)		19
20	SpecCtrl	SPEC_CTRL (MSR 2E0h) virtualization	(reserved)		20
21	ROGPT	Read-Only Guest Page Table supported	(reserved)		21
22	(reserved)		(reserved)		22
23	HOST_MCE_OVERRIDE	Guest mode Machine-check exceptions when host CR4.MCE=1 and guest CR4.MCE=0 cause intercepts instead of shutdowns	(reserved)		23
24	TlbiCtl	INVLPGB/TLBSYNC hypervisor enable in VMCB and TLBSYNC intercept support	(reserved)		24
25	VNMI	NMI (Non-Maskable interrupt) virtualization	(reserved)		25
26	IbsVirt	IBS (Instruction-Based Sampling) virtualization	(reserved)		26
27	ExtLvtOffsetFaultChg	Read/Write fault behavior for extended LVT offsets (APIC addresses 0x500-0x530) changed to Read Allowed, Write #VMEXIT	(reserved)		27
28	VmcbAddrChkChg	VMCB address check change	(reserved)		28
29	BusLockThreshold	Bus Lock Threshold	(reserved)		29
30	IdleHltIntercept	Idle HLT (HLT instruction executed while no virtual interrupt is pending) intercept	(reserved)		30
31	EnhancedShutdownIntercept	Support for EXITINFO1 on shutdown intercept, and nested shutdown intercepts will result in a non-interceptible shutdown.	(reserved)		31

== EAX=8000'001Fh: Encrypted Memory Capabilities ==
CPUID EAX=8000'001Fh: Encrypted Memory feature bits in EAX
Bit	EAX	
Bit	Short	Feature
0	SME	Secure Memory Encryption
1	SEV/ CSV	AMD: Secure Encrypted Virtualization; Hygon: China Secure Virtualization (1st generation)
2	PageFlushMSR	Page flush MSR (C001_011Eh) supported
3	SEV-ES/ CSV2 (Hygon)	AMD: SEV Encrypted State; Hygon: China Secure Virtualization (2nd generation)
4	SEV-SNP	SEV Secure Nested Paging
5	VMPL	VM Privilege Levels
6	RMPQUERY	RMPQUERY instruction supported
7	VmplSSS	VMPL Supervisor shadow stack supported
8	SecureTSC	Secure TSC supported
9	TscAuxVirtualization	Virtualization of TSC_AUX MSR (C000_0103) supported
10	HwEnfCacheCoh	Hardware cache coherency across encryption domains enforced
11	64BitHost	SEV Guest execution only allowed from 64-bit host
12	RestrictedInjection	SEV-ES guests can refuse all event-injections except #HV (Hypervisor Injection Exception)
13	AlternateInjection	SEV-ES guests can use an encrypted VMCB field for event-injection
14	DebugVirt	Full debug state virtualization supported for SEV-ES and SEV-SNP guests
15	PreventHostIBS	Prevent host IBS for a SEV-ES guest
16	VTE	Virtual Transparent Encryption for SEV
17	VmgexitParameter	VMGEXIT parameter is supported (using the RAX register)
18	VirtualTomMsr	Virtual TOM (top-of-memory) MSR (C001_0135) supported
19	IbsVirtGuestCtl	IBS virtualization is supported for SEV-ES and SEV-SNP guests
20	PmcVirtGuestCtl	PMC virtualization is supported for SEV-ES and SEV-SNP guests
21	RMPREAD	RMPREAD instruction supported
22	GuestInterceptControl	Guest Intercept control supported for SEV-ES guests
23	SegmentedRmp	Segmented RMP (Reverse-Map Table) supported
24	VmsaRegProt	VMSA (VM Save Area) register protection supported
25	SmtProtection	SMT Protection supported
26	SecureAvic	Secure AVIC supported
27	AllowedSEVfeatures	ALLOWED_SEV_FEATURES_MASK field in VMCB (offset 138h) supported
28	SVSMCommPageMSR	SVSM (Secure VM Service Module) communication page MSR (C001_F000h) supported
29	NestedVirtSnpMsr	VIRT_RMPUPDATE (C001_F001h) and VIRT_PSMASH (C001_F002h) MSRs supported
30	HvInUseWrAllowed/ CSV3	AMD: Writes to Hypervisor-owned paged allowed when marked in-use; Hygon: China Secure Virtualization (3rd generation)
31	IbpbOnEntry	IBPB on entry to virtual machine supported

CPUID EAX=8000'001Fh: Encrypted Memory feature information in EBX, ECX and EDX
Bits	EBX	ECX	EDX	Bits	
5:0	C-bit (encryption enable bit) location in page table entry	Maximum ASID value that can be used for a SEV-enabled guest (maximum number of encrypted guests that can be supported simultaneously)	Minimum ASID value for a guest that is SEV-enabled but not SEV-ES-enabled	5:0	
11:6	Physical address width reduction when memory encryption is enabled	Maximum ASID value that can be used for a SEV-enabled guest (maximum number of encrypted guests that can be supported simultaneously)	Minimum ASID value for a guest that is SEV-enabled but not SEV-ES-enabled	11:6	
15:12	Number of VMPLs (VM Privilege Levels) supported	Maximum ASID value that can be used for a SEV-enabled guest (maximum number of encrypted guests that can be supported simultaneously)	Minimum ASID value for a guest that is SEV-enabled but not SEV-ES-enabled	15:12	
30:16	(reserved)	Maximum ASID value that can be used for a SEV-enabled guest (maximum number of encrypted guests that can be supported simultaneously)	Minimum ASID value for a guest that is SEV-enabled but not SEV-ES-enabled	30:16	
31	COHERENCY_SFW_NO	Maximum ASID value that can be used for a SEV-enabled guest (maximum number of encrypted guests that can be supported simultaneously)	Minimum ASID value for a guest that is SEV-enabled but not SEV-ES-enabled	Software workaround is not needed for the SEV-SNP cache coherency vulnerability	31

== EAX=8000'0021h: Extended Feature Identification ==
CPUID EAX=8000'0021h: Extended feature bits in EAX and ECX
Bit	EAX		ECX		Bit
Bit	Short	Feature	Short	Feature	Bit
0	NoNestedDataBp	Processor ignores nested data breakpoints	(reserved)		0
1	FsGsKernelGsBaseNonSerializing	WRMSR to the FS_BASE, GS_BASE and KernelGSBase MSRs is non-serializing	TSA_SQ_NO	If set, then CPU is not vulnerable to TSA-SQ	1
2	LFenceAlwaysSerializing	LFENCE is always dispatch serializing	TSA_L1_NO	If set, then CPU is not vulnerable to TSA-L1	2
3	SmmPgCfgLock	SMM paging configuration lock supported	ThreadPatchLevel	MSR C001_0023h holds ID of last microcode patch loaded by thread	3
4	TLBSYNC_SFW_NO	AMD family 1Ah (Zen5/Zen6): If set, the operation of the INVLPGB/TLBSYNC instructions is not affected by Erratum #1718.	AspPatchAuth	If set, microcode patches are authenticated by the AMD Security Processor (ASP)	4
5	VERW_CLEAR	VERW instruction can, when executed with a memory operand in Ring 0, be used to clear microarchitectural data buffers to help mitigate TSA (Transient Scheduler Attacks).	SfsPatchLoad	If set, microcode patches cannot be loaded with the patch loader MSR but must instead be loaded through SFS (Seamless Firmware Servicing)	5
6	NullSelectClearsBase	Null segment selector loads also clear the destination segment register base and limit	(reserved)		6
7	UpperAddressIgnore	Upper Address Ignore (Version 1) is supported	TSA_FILL_NO	If set, then the CPU is not vulnerable to TSA-FILL	7
8	AutomaticIBRS	Automatic IBRS	BtbCtxIsolation	Branch predictions in one context may only be influenced by execution in the same context.	8
9	NoSmmCtlMSR	SMM_CTL MSR (C0010116h) is not supported	(reserved)		9
10	FSRS	Fast short REP STOSB supported	SameFpWidthReporting	HWCR[ReportSameFpWidth] (bit 40) supported	10
11	FSRC	Fast short REPE CMPSB supported	(reserved)		11
12	PMC2PreciseRetire	PreciseRetire performance counter control bit (MSR C0010002h bit 43) supported	(reserved)		12
13	PrefetchCtlMsr	PrefetchControl MSR (C0000108h) is supported	(reserved)		13
14	L2TlbSIzeX32	If set, L2 TLB sizes (leaf 80000006h) are encoded as multiples of 32	(reserved)		14
15	AMD_ERMSB	Processor supports AMD implementation of Enhanced REP MOVSB and REP STOSB	(reserved)		15
16	OPCODE_0F017_RECLAIM	Reserves opcode 0F 01 /7 for AMD use, returning #UD.	(reserved)		16
17	CpuidUserDis	CPUID disable for non-privileged software (#GP)	(reserved)		17
18	EPSF	Enhanced Predictive Store Forwarding supported	(reserved)		18
19	FAST_REP_SCASB	Fast Short REP SCASB supported	(reserved)		19
20	PREFETCHI	Instruction Cache prefetch instructions PREFETCHIT0 and PREFETCHIT1 supported (Note: On Intel processors, support for the instruction-cache prefetch instructions is not indicated by CPUID.(EAX=8000_0021h):EAX[20] but instead by CPUID.(EAX=7,ECX=1):EDX[14].)	(reserved)		20
21	FP512_DOWNGRADE	Downgrade of 512-bit datapath to 256-bit supported. (Note: If the downgrade from 512-bit to 256-bit datapath is enabled, then AVX-512 instructions that work on 512-bit data items will be split into two 256-bit parts that will be issued over two consecutive cycles. This datapath downgrade can help improve power efficiency for some workloads.)	(reserved)		21
22	WL_CLASS_SUPPORT	Support for workload-based heuristic feedback to OS for scheduling decisions	(reserved)		22
23	AVX512_BMM	AVX-512 Bit Matrix Multiply and Bit Reverse instructions	(reserved)		23
24	ERAPS	Enhanced Return Address Predictor Security (see also EBX[23:16] "RapSize")	(reserved)		24
25	(reserved)		(reserved)		25
26	UpperAddressIgnore2	Upper Address Ignore (Version 2) is supported	(reserved)		26
27	SBPB	Selective Branch Predictor Barrier supported	(reserved)		27
28	IBPB_BRTYPE	IBPB flushes all branch type predictions	(reserved)		28
29	SRSO_NO	CPU is not subject to SRSO (Speculative Return Stack Overflow) vulnerability	(reserved)		29
30	SRSO_USER_KERNEL_NO	CPU is not subject to SRSO vulnerability across user/kernel boundary	(reserved)		30
31	SRSO_MSR_FIX	SRSO can be mitigated by setting bit 4 of BP_CFG (MSR C001_102E)	(reserved)		31

CPUID EAX=8000'0021h: Extended feature information in EBX
Bits	EBX	
Bits	Short	Feature
15:0	MicrocodePatchSize	The size of the Microcode patch in 16-byte multiples. If 0, the size of the patch is at most 5568 (15C0h) bytes
23:16	RapSize	Return Address Predictor Size. RapSize * 8 is the minimum number of CALL instructions without matching RET instructions that are needed to flush the Return Address Predictor.
31:24	(reserved)	

== EAX=8000'0025h: Encrypted Memory Capabilities 2 ==
CPUID EAX=8000'0025h: Encrypted memory feature information in EAX, EBX and EDX
Bits	EAX		EBX		EDX		Bits
Bits	Short	Feature	Short	Feature	Short	Feature	Bits
0	MinRmpSegSize	Minimum supported RMP Segment Size	NumCachedSegments	Number of cached RMP segment definitions	RmpOpt	RMPOPT instruction	0
1	MinRmpSegSize	Minimum supported RMP Segment Size	NumCachedSegments	Number of cached RMP segment definitions	EnhSmtProtection	Enhanced SMT Protection	1
2	MinRmpSegSize	Minimum supported RMP Segment Size	NumCachedSegments	Number of cached RMP segment definitions	RmpDirty	RMP Dirty feature and RMPCHKD instruction	2
5:3	MinRmpSegSize	Minimum supported RMP Segment Size	NumCachedSegments	Number of cached RMP segment definitions	(reserved)		5:3
9:6	MaxRmpSegSize	Maximum supported RMP Segment Size	NumCachedSegments	Number of cached RMP segment definitions	(reserved)		9:6
10	MaxRmpSegSize	Maximum supported RMP Segment Size	NumSegReduction	Number of RMP segments is reduced	(reserved)		10
11	MaxRmpSegSize	Maximum supported RMP Segment Size	(reserved)		(reserved)		11
31:12	(reserved)		(reserved)		(reserved)		31:12

== EAX=8C86'0000h: Hygon Extended Feature Flags ==
Returns index of highest Hygon feature leaf in EAX (valid if greater than or equal to 8C860000h), and Hygon feature flags in EDX.

CPUID EAX=8C86'0000h: Hygon feature flags in EDX
Bits	EDX	
Bits	Short	Feature
0	(reserved)	
1	sm3	Hygon SM3 instructions
2	sm4	Hygon SM4 instructions
31:3	(reserved)	

== EAX=8FFF'FFFEh and EAX=8FFF'FFFFh: AMD Easter Eggs ==
Several AMD CPU models will, for CPUID with EAX=8FFF'FFFFh, return an Easter egg string in EAX, EBX, ECX and EDX. Known Easter Egg strings include:

Processor	String
AMD K6	NexGen‍erationAMD
AMD K8	IT'S HAMMER TIME
AMD Jaguar	HELLO KITTY! ^-^

Additionally, AMD K6 CPUs will, for CPUID with EAX=8FFF'FFFEh, return an Easter egg reference to "DEI" in EAX.

== EAX=C000'0000h: Highest Centaur Extended Function ==
Returns index of highest Centaur leaf in EAX. If the returned value in EAX is less than C0000001h, then Centaur extended leaves are not supported.

Present in CPUs from VIA and Zhaoxin.

On IDT WinChip CPUs (CentaurHauls Family 5), the extended leaves C0000001h-C0000005h do not encode any Centaur-specific functionality but are instead aliases of leaves 80000001h-80000005h.

== EAX=C000'0001h: Centaur Feature Information ==
This leaf returns Centaur feature information (mainly VIA/Zhaoxin PadLock) in EDX. (EAX, EBX and ECX are reserved.)

CPUID EAX=C000'0001h: Centaur feature bits in EDX
Bit	EDX	
Bit	Short	Feature
0	sm2 (Note: On VIA Nehemiah and Antaur CPUs (CentaurHauls Family 6 Model 9 only), bits 0,1,4,5 are used differently: Bit 0: Alternate Instruction Set (AIS) present; Bit 1: AIS enabled; Bit 4: LongHaul MSR (MSR 0x110A) present; Bit 5: FEMMS instruction (opcode 0F 0E) present)	GMI SM2 instruction present
1	sm2_en	SM2 enabled
2	rng	PadLock RNG present: XSTORE and REP XSTORE instructions
3	rng_en	RNG enabled
4	ccs	GMI SM3/SM4 instructions present: CCS_HASH and CCS_ENCRYPT
5	ccs_en	SM3/SM4 instructions enabled
6	xcrypt	PadLock Advanced Cryptographic Engine (ACE, using AES cipher) present: REP XCRYPT(ECB,CBC,CFB,OFB) instructions
7	xcrypt_en	ACE enabled
8	ace2	ACE v2 present: REP XCRYPTCTR instruction, as well as support for digest mode and misaligned data for ACE's REP XCRYPT* instructions.
9	ace2_en	ACE v2 enabled
10	phe	PadLock Hash Engine (PHE): REP XSHA1 and REP XSHA256 instructions
11	phe_en	PHE enabled
12	pmm	PadLock Montgomery Multiplier (PMM): REP MONTMUL instruction
13	pmm_en	PMM enabled
14	(reserved)	
15	zx_fma	FMA supported
16	parallax	Adaptive P-state control present
17	parallax_en	Adaptive P-state control enabled
18	overstress	Overstress feature for auto overclock present
19	overstress_en	Overstress feature for auto overclock enabled
20	tm3	Thermal Monitor 3 present
21	tm3_en	Thermal Monitor 3 enabled
22	rng2	RNG v2 - second generation RNG present: REP XRNG2 instruction
23	rng2_en	RNG v2 enabled
24	sme	SME feature present
25	phe2	PHE v2: SHA384 and SHA512 present
26	phe2_en	PHE v2 enabled
27	xmodx	RSA instructions present: XMODEXP and MONTMUL2 instructions
28	xmodx_en	RSA instructions enabled
29	vex	VEX instructions present
30	vex_en	VEX instructions enabled
31	stk	STK is present

== EAX=C000'0002h: Centaur Extended CPUID Performance Data ==
This leaf returns information about CPU voltage, temperature, clock multipliers and power-on settings for VIA C7 processors in EAX, EBX, ECX and EDX.

CPUID EAX=C000'0002h: Centaur Extended CPUID Performance Data
Bit	EAX (Note: On the VIA C7, if the on-chip temperature sensor has been turned off, then EAX will return 0.)	EBX	ECX	EDX	Bit
7:0	Fractional temperature	Current voltage: (16*[7:0]+700) mV	Highest voltage: (16*[7:0]+700) mV	(reserved)	7:0
13:8	Current temperature in Celsius	Current clock multiplier	Highest clock multiplier	(reserved)	13:8
14	Current temperature in Celsius	Current clock multiplier	Highest clock multiplier	1MB Reset vector (0=0xFFFFFFF0,1=0x000FFFF0)	14
15	Current temperature in Celsius	Current clock multiplier	Highest clock multiplier	(reserved)	15
17:16	Current temperature in Celsius	(reserved)	Lowest voltage: (16*[23:16]+700) mV	APIC Cluster ID	17:16
19:18	Current temperature in Celsius	(reserved)	Lowest voltage: (16*[23:16]+700) mV	Input Front Side Bus Clock (00=100 MHz, 01=133Mz, 10=200 MHz, 11=166 MHz)	19:18
21:20	Current temperature in Celsius	(reserved)	Lowest voltage: (16*[23:16]+700) mV	APIC Agent ID	21:20
23:22	Current temperature in Celsius	(reserved)	Lowest voltage: (16*[23:16]+700) mV	Current clock ratio	23:22
26:24	Current temperature in Celsius	Lowest clock ratio	Lowest clock multiplier	Current clock ratio	26:24
31:27	Current temperature in Celsius	Lowest clock ratio	Lowest clock multiplier	(reserved)	31:27

== EAX=C000'0006h, ECX=0: Zhaoxin Feature Information ==
This sub-leaf returns feature information in EAX. EBX, ECX and EDX are reserved.

CPUID EAX=C000'0006h, ECX=0: Zhaoxin feature bits in EAX
Bit	EAX	
Bit	Short	Feature
0	pauseopt	PAUSEOPT instruction
1	(reserved) (Note: As of April 2026, bits 1 and 3 of EAX are not listed in any known public Zhaoxin documentation, but have been observed to be set on some KaiXian KX-7000 "Shijidadao" processors.)	
2	(reserved)	
3	(reserved)	
31:4	(reserved)	

== CPUID usage from high-level languages ==
=== Inline assembly ===
This information is easy to access from other languages as well. For instance, the C code for gcc below prints the first five values, returned by the cpuid:

#include <stdio.h>
#include <cpuid.h>

int main()
{
    unsigned int i, eax, ebx, ecx, edx;

    for (i = 0; i < 5; i++) {
        __cpuid(i, eax, ebx, ecx, edx);
        printf ("InfoType %x\nEAX: %x\nEBX: %x\nECX: %x\nEDX: %x\n", i, eax, ebx, ecx, edx);
    }

    return 0;
}

In MSVC and Borland/Embarcadero C compilers (bcc32) flavored inline assembly, the clobbering information is implicit in the instructions:

#include <stdio.h>

int main()
{
    unsigned int a, b, c, d, i = 0;

    __asm {
        /* Do the call. */
        mov EAX, i;
        cpuid;
        /* Save results. */
        mov a, EAX;
        mov b, EBX;
        mov c, ECX;
        mov d, EDX;
    }

    printf ("InfoType %x\nEAX: %x\nEBX: %x\nECX: %x\nEDX: %x\n", i, a, b, c, d);
    return 0;
}

If either version was written in plain assembly language, the programmer must manually save the results of EAX, EBX, ECX, and EDX elsewhere if they want to keep using the values.

=== Wrapper functions ===
GCC also provides a header called <cpuid.h> on systems that have CPUID. The __cpuid is a macro expanding to inline assembly. Typical usage would be:

#include <stdio.h>
#include <cpuid.h>

int main()
{
    unsigned int eax, ebx, ecx, edx;

    __cpuid(0 /* vendor string */, eax, ebx, ecx, edx);
    printf("EAX: %x\nEBX: %x\nECX: %x\nEDX: %x\n", eax, ebx, ecx, edx);

    return 0;
}

But if one requested an extended feature not present on this CPU, they would not notice and might get random, unexpected results. Safer version is also provided in <cpuid.h>. It checks for extended features and does some more safety checks. The output values are not passed using reference-like macro parameters, but more conventional pointers.

#include <stdio.h>
#include <cpuid.h>

int main()
{
    unsigned int eax, ebx, ecx, edx;

    /* 0x81234567 is nonexistent, but assume it exists */
    if (!__get_cpuid (0x81234567, &eax, &ebx, &ecx, &edx)) {
        printf("Warning: CPUID request 0x81234567 not valid!\n");
        return 1;
    }

    printf("EAX: %x\nEBX: %x\nECX: %x\nEDX: %x\n", eax, ebx, ecx, edx);

    return 0;
}

Notice the ampersands in &a, &b, &c, &d and the conditional statement. If the __get_cpuid call receives a correct request, it will return a non-zero value, if it fails, zero.

Microsoft Visual C compiler has builtin function __cpuid() so the cpuid instruction may be embedded without using inline assembly, which is handy since the x86-64 version of MSVC does not allow inline assembly at all. The same program for MSVC would be:

#include <stdio.h>
#ifdef _MSC_VER
    #include <intrin.h>
#endif

int main()
{
    unsigned int regs[4];
    int i;

    for (i = 0; i < 4; i++) {
        __cpuid(regs, i);
        printf("The code %d gives %d, %d, %d, %d", regs[0], regs[1], regs[2], regs[3]);
    }

    return 0;
}

Many interpreted or compiled scripting languages are capable of using CPUID via an FFI library. One such implementation shows usage of the Ruby FFI module to execute assembly language that includes the CPUID opcode.

.NET 5 and later versions provide the System.Runtime.Intrinsics.X86.X86base.CpuId method. For instance, the C# code below prints the processor brand if it supports CPUID instruction:

using System.Runtime.InteropServices;
using System.Runtime.Intrinsics.X86;
using System.Text;

namespace X86CPUID {
    class CPUBrandString {
        public static void Main(string[] args) {
            if (!X86Base.IsSupported) {
                Console.WriteLine("Your CPU does not support CPUID instruction.");
            } else {
                Span<int> raw = stackalloc int[12];
             (raw[0], raw[1], raw[2], raw[3]) = X86Base.CpuId(unchecked((int)0x80000002), 0);
             (raw[4], raw[5], raw[6], raw[7]) = X86Base.CpuId(unchecked((int)0x80000003), 0);
             (raw[8], raw[9], raw[10], raw[11]) = X86Base.CpuId(unchecked((int)0x80000004), 0);

                Span<byte> bytes = MemoryMarshal.AsBytes(raw);
                string brand = Encoding.UTF8.GetString(bytes).Trim();
                Console.WriteLine(brand);
            }
        }
    }
}

== CPU-specific information outside x86 ==
Some of the non-x86 CPU architectures also provide certain forms of structured information about the processor's abilities, commonly as a set of special registers:

- ARM architectures have a CPUID coprocessor register which requires exception level EL1 or above to access.
- System/370 through z/Architecture IBM mainframe processors have a supervisor-mode-only Store CPU ID (STIDP) instruction, which provides information that includes the CPU type.
- The z/Architecture mainframe processors also have a supervisor-mode-only Store Facilities List (STFL) instruction, and a non-privileged Store Facilities List Extended (STFLE) instruction, which list the installed hardware features.
- The MIPS32/64 architecture defines a mandatory Processor Identification (PrId) and a series of daisy-chained Configuration Registers.
- The PowerPC processor has the 32-bit read-only Processor Version Register (PVR) identifying the processor model in use. The instruction requires supervisor access level.
- The RISC-V architecture has an mcpuid "read-only register containing information regarding the capabilities of the CPU implementation"

DSP and transputer-like chip families have not taken up the instruction in any noticeable way, in spite of having (in relative terms) as many variations in design. Alternate ways of silicon identification might be present; for example, DSPs from Texas Instruments contain a memory-based register set for each functional unit that starts with identifiers determining the unit type and model, its ASIC design revision and features selected at the design phase, and continues with unit-specific control and data registers. Access to these areas is performed by simply using the existing load and store instructions; thus, for such devices, there is no need for extending the register set for device identification purposes.

== See also ==
- sandpile.org, the world's leading source for technical x86 processor information
- x86-cpuid.org, a complete x86 architecture CPUID database plus related code generation tools, to be used by both the Linux Kernel and the Xen hypervisor.
- CPU-Z, a Windows utility that uses CPUID to identify various system settings
- CPU-X, an alternative of CPU-Z for Linux and FreeBSD
- Spectre (security vulnerability)
- Speculative Store Bypass (SSB)
- /proc/cpuinfo, a text file generated by certain systems containing some of the CPUID information
