= FCMOV =

Instruction for x86 processors

FCMOV is a floating point conditional move opcode of the Intel x86 architecture, first introduced in Pentium Pro processors. It copies the contents of one of the floating point stack register, depending on the contents of EFLAGS integer flag register, to the ST(0) (top of stack) register. There are 8 variants of the instruction selected by the condition codes that need be set for the instruction to perform the move.

Similar to the CMOV instruction, FCMOV allows some conditional operations to be performed without the usual branching overhead. However, it has a higher latency than conditional branch instructions. Therefore, it is most useful for simple yet unpredictable comparison or conditional operations, where it can provide substantial performance gains.

The instruction is usually used with the FCOMI instruction or the FCOM-FSTSW-SAHF idiom to set the relevant condition codes based on the result of a floating point comparison.

== Variants ==
This table shows the variants of the FCMOV instructions. The first operand is always the ST(0) register (equivalently, the top of the floating point stack). The Opcode column indicates a two-byte sequence where the second byte is a base value indicating the number of the floating point stack register to use for the second operand. Add the desired number to complete the corresponding opcode value.

Opcode	Mnemonic	Meaning	Condition
DA C0+i	FCMOVB	Move if below	Carry flag set
DA C8+i	FCMOVE	Move if equal	Zero flag set
DA D0+i	FCMOVBE	Move if below or equal	Carry flag or Zero flag set
DA D8+i	FCMOVU	Move if unordered	Parity flag set
DB C0+i	FCMOVNB	Move if not below	Carry flag cleared
DB C8+i	FCMOVNE	Move if not equal	Zero flag cleared
DB D0+i	FCMOVNBE	Move if not below or equal	Carry flag and Zero flag cleared
DB D8+i	FCMOVNU	Move if not unordered	Parity flag cleared
