= Super Socket 7 =

Computer hardware component

- Release date: 1998-05
- Type: ZIF
- Chip form factors: SPGA
- Contacts: 321
- FSB protocol: P5
- FSB frequency: 66.7, 68.5, 75, 83.3, 95, 97, 100 MHz
- Voltage range: 1.6–2.4 V
- Processor dimensions: 49.5 mm × 49.5 mm
- Processors: AMD K6-2 (300–550 MHz); AMD K6-2+ (500 MHz); AMD K6-III (400–550 MHz); Cyrix MII (PR366/250 MHz – PR433/300 MHz); IDT WinChip 2 (200–250 MHz); Rise mP6
- Predecessor: Socket 7
- Successor: Slot A
- Memory support: EDO DRAM or/& SDRAM
- This article is part of the CPU socket series

Super Socket 7, also referred to as Super 7, is a hardware-level extension of the Socket 7 ZIF socket specification for x86 processors. It was released in May 1998. Compatible motherboards and chipsets use a standard Socket 7 connection for the CPU, while adding certain features including a maximum 100 MHz front-side bus and support for AGP graphics cards.

Super Socket 7 was used by AMD K6-2 and K6-III processors, some of the final Cyrix M-II processors, some of the final IDT WinChip 2 processors, and Rise mP6 processors. It is backward compatible with Socket 7 CPUs, meaning a Socket 7 CPU can be used with a Super Socket 7 motherboard, but a Super Socket 7 CPU cannot operate at full speed in a Socket 7 motherboard. Socket 5 CPUs are pin-compatible with Super Socket 7, but not all motherboards designed for Super Socket 7 supported the voltages or bus speeds needed for Socket 5 CPUs.

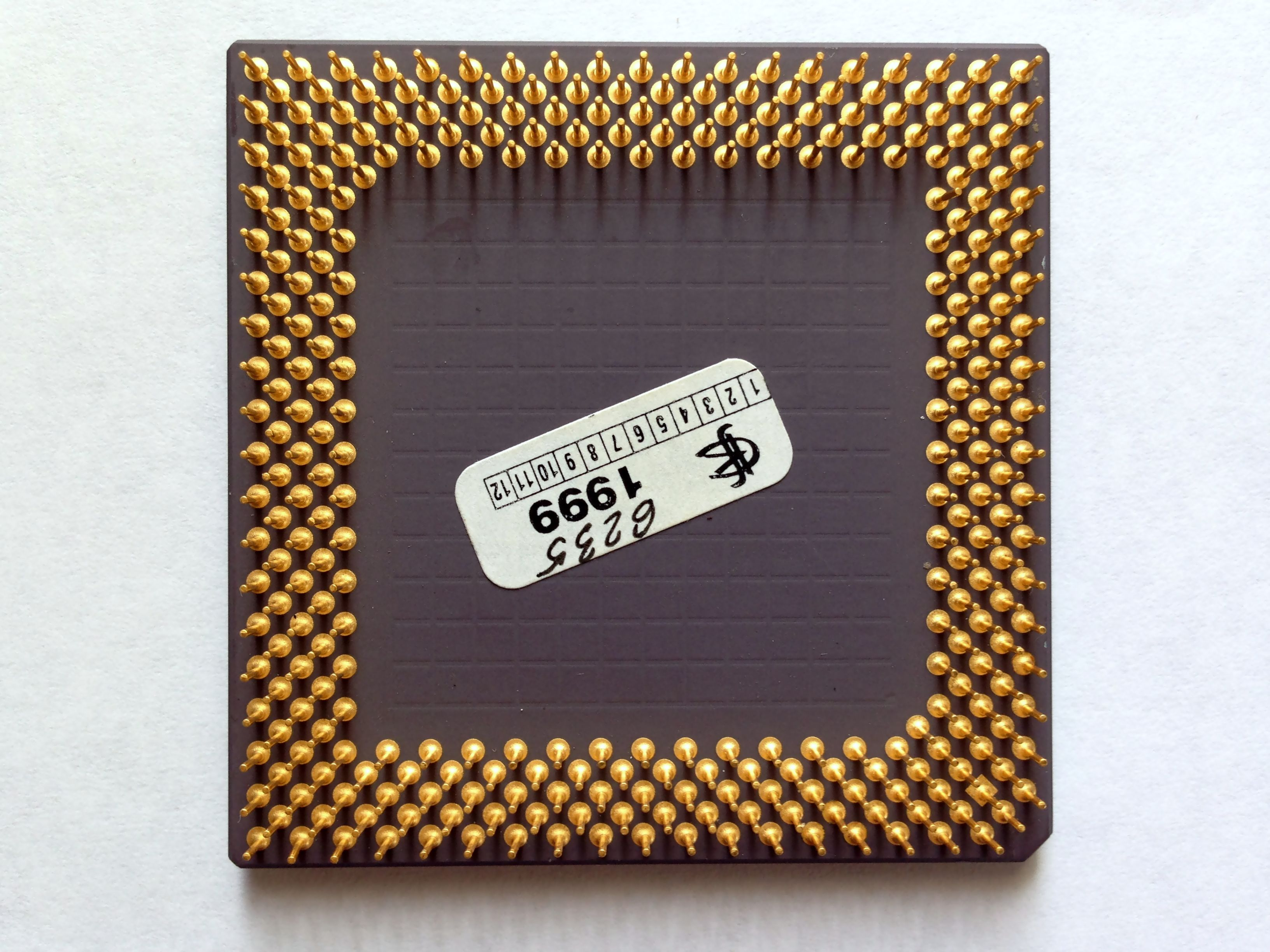
Super Socket 7 CPU back (AMD K6-2)

While AMD had previously always used Intel sockets for their processors, Socket 7 was the last one for which AMD retained legal rights. Intel had hoped by discontinuing Socket 7 development and moving to Slot 1 that AMD would be left with an outdated platform, making their processors non-competitive. By extending the FSB from 66 to 100 MHz, Super Socket 7 gave AMD the stopgap solution they needed while developing their own independent motherboard infrastructure, Slot A.

While the architecture was cheap, and served the intended purpose, many of the third party chipsets provided by VIA, SiS, ALi, and others, were of low quality, especially with regard to the AGP implementations. The reputation AMD gained for buggy, incompatible motherboards lingered, and though an internal program by VIA to raise standards for their chipsets had begun to show results in the K6-III and Pentium III era, AMD put in place a quality assurance program for the Athlon processor.

== See also ==
- List of AMD microprocessors
