= MP 6 =

MP6, MP 6, or mP6 may refer to:

- mP6, a microprocessor
- MP 6, a zone during the Oligocene
- Mario Party 6, a 2004 Nintendo GameCube video game and the third game for the console
