= Socket 7 =

Physical and electrical specification for an x86-style CPU socket

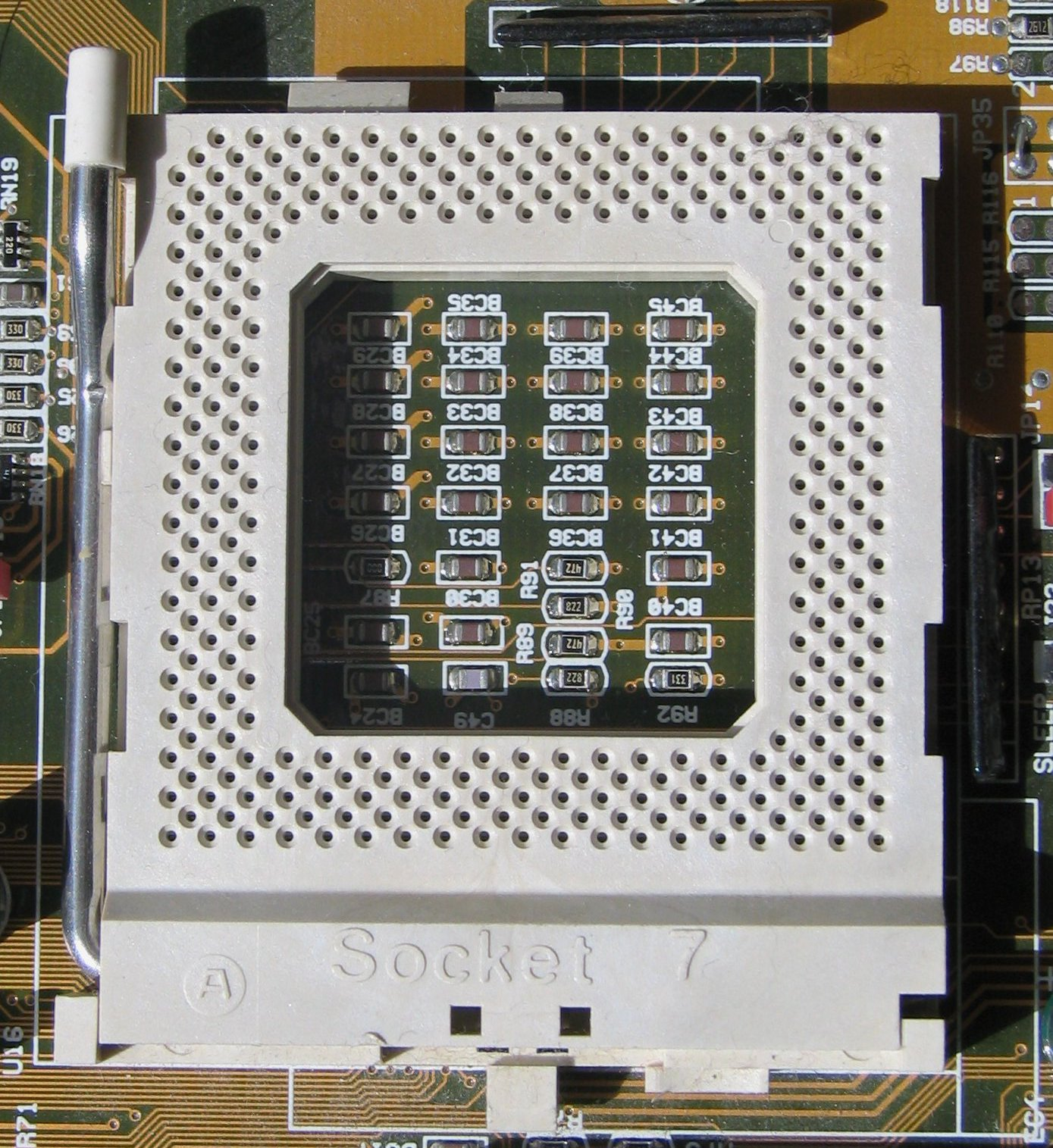
- Release date: 1995-06
- Type: ZIF
- Chip form factors: SPGA
- Contacts: 321
- FSB protocol: P5
- FSB frequency: 66–83 MHz System Clock
- Voltage range: 2.5–3.5 V
- Processor dimensions: 49.5 mm × 49.5 mm
- Processors: 75–233 MHz Intel P5 Pentium, AMD K5 to K6, Cyrix 6x86 (and 6x86MX) P120–P233
- Predecessor: Socket 5
- Successor: Socket 8 (Intel); Slot 1 (Intel); Super Socket 7 (AMD)
- Memory support: EDO DRAM or/& SDRAM
- This article is part of the CPU socket series

Socket 7 is a physical and electrical specification for an x86-style CPU socket on a personal computer motherboard. It was released in June 1995. The socket supersedes the earlier Socket 5, and accepts P5 Pentium microprocessors manufactured by Intel, as well as compatibles made by Cyrix/IBM, AMD, IDT and others. Socket 7 was the only socket that supported a wide range of CPUs from different manufacturers and a wide range of speeds.

Differences between Socket 5 and Socket 7 are that Socket 7 has an extra pin and is designed to provide dual split rail voltage, as opposed to Socket 5's single voltage. However, not all motherboard manufacturers supported the dual voltage on their boards initially. Socket 7 is backward compatible; a Socket 5 CPU can be inserted and used on a Socket 7 motherboard.

Processors that used Socket 7 are the AMD K5 and K6, the Cyrix 6x86 and 6x86MX, the IDT WinChip, the Intel P5 Pentium (2.5–3.5 V, 75–200 MHz), the Pentium MMX (166–233 MHz), and the Rise Technology mP6.

Socket 7 typically uses a 321-pin (arranged as 19 by 19 pins) SPGA ZIF socket or the very rare 296-pin (arranged as 37 by 37 pins) SPGA LIF socket. The size is 1.95" x 1.95" (4.95 cm x 4.95 cm).

An extension of Socket 7, Super Socket 7, was developed by AMD for their K6-2 and K6-III processors to operate at a higher clock rate and use AGP.

Socket 7 and Socket 8 were replaced by Slot 1 and Slot 2 in 1999.

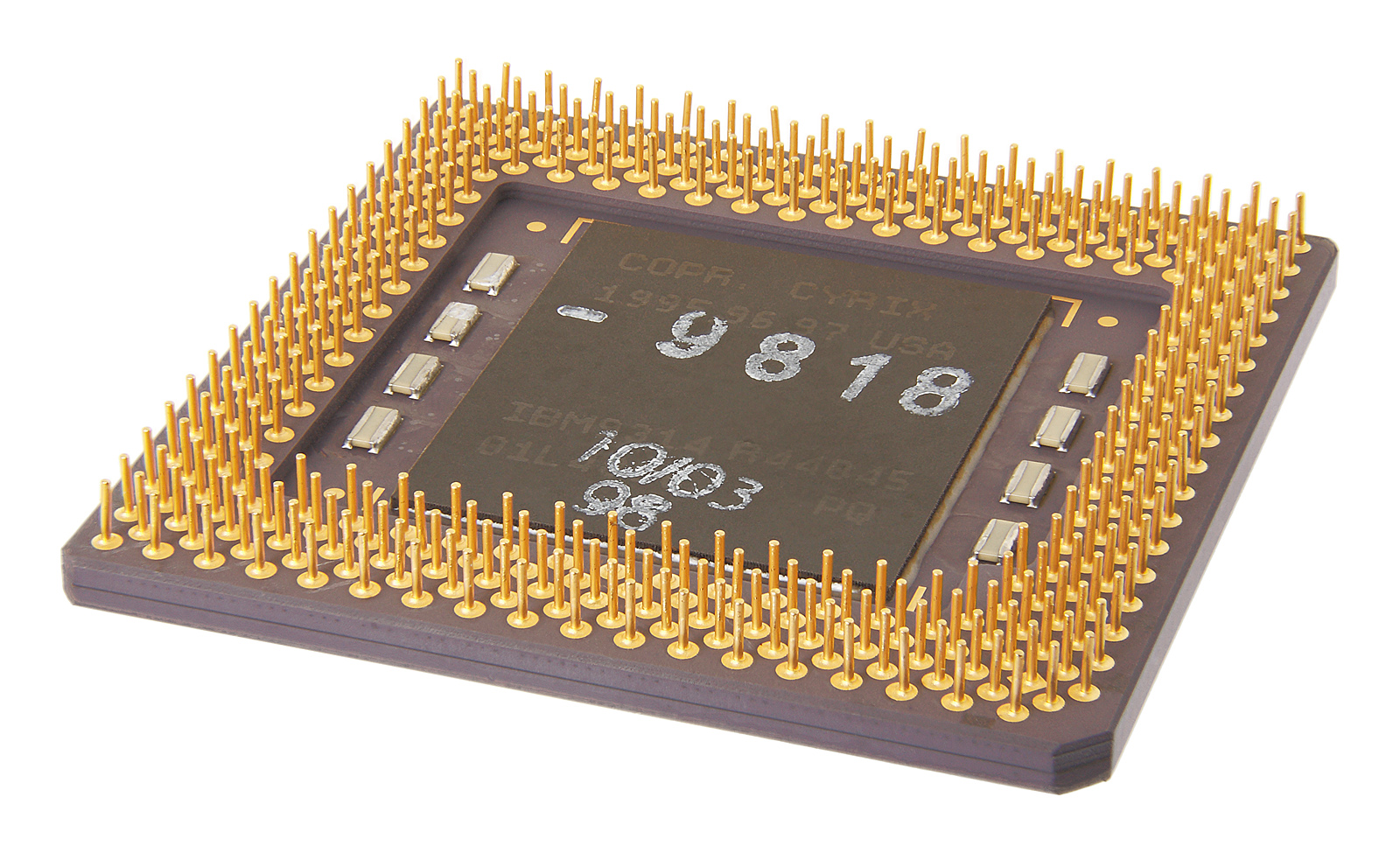
Bottom view of a socket 7, 321-pin SPGA CPU

== See also ==
- List of Intel microprocessors
- List of AMD microprocessors
