= WinChip =

Series of CPUs

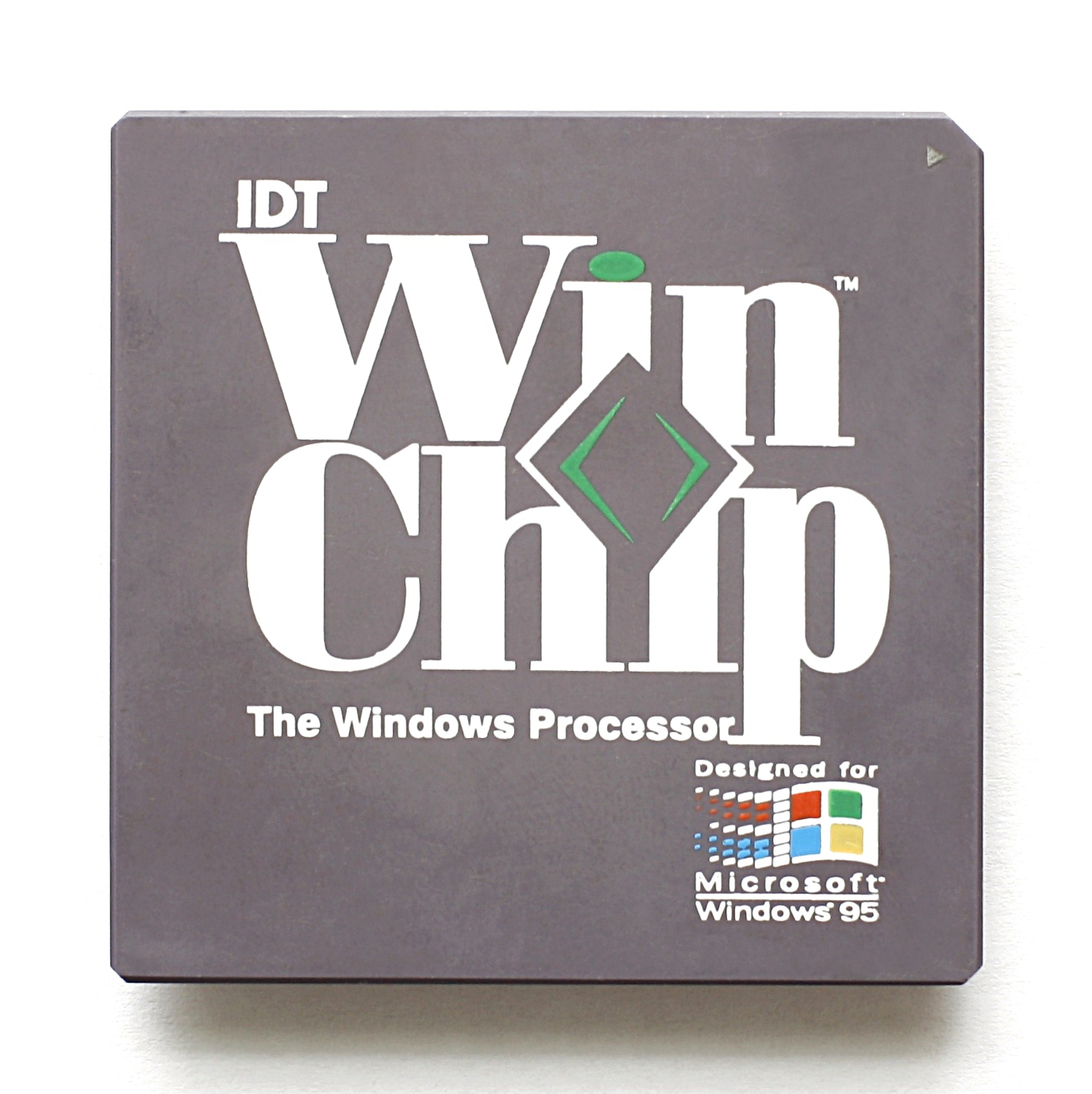
- IDT WinChip Marketing sample

General information
- Launched: 1997; 29 years ago
- Discontinued: 1999; 27 years ago
- Marketed by: IDT
- Designed by: Centaur Technology
- CPUID code: 0540h, 0541h, 0585h, 0587h, 058Ah, 0595h

Performance
- Max. CPU clock rate: 180 Mhz to 266 Mhz
- FSB speeds: 60 MT/s to 100 MT/s

Physical specifications
- Cores: 1
- Packages: CPGA (C6, W2, W2A, W3); PPGA (W2B)
- Sockets: Socket 5; Socket 7; Super Socket 7

Cache
- L1 cache: 64 KiB (C6, W2, W2A and W2B); 128 KiB (W3)
- L2 cache: Motherboard dependent
- L3 cache: none

Architecture and classification
- Technology node: 0.35 μm to 0.25 μm
- Microarchitecture: Single, 4-stage, pipeline in-order execution
- Instruction set: x86-16, IA-32

Products, models, variants
- Core names: C6; W2, C6+; W2A; W2B; W3
- Brand name: WinChip

History
- Successor: Cyrix III

WinChip is a discontinued series of low-power Socket 7-based x86 processors that was designed by Centaur Technology and marketed by its parent company IDT.

== Overview ==
=== Design ===
The design of the WinChip was quite different from other processors of the time. Instead of a large gate count and die area, IDT, using its experience from the RISC processor market, created a small and electrically efficient processor similar to the 80486, because of its single pipeline and in-order execution microarchitecture. It was of much simpler design than its Socket 7 competitors, such as AMD K5/K6, which were superscalar and based on dynamic translation to buffered micro-operations with advanced instruction reordering (out of order execution).

=== Use ===
WinChip was, in general, designed to perform well with popular applications that did few floating point calculations, if any. This included operating systems of the time and the majority of software used in businesses. It was also designed to be a drop-in replacement for the more complex, and thus more expensive, processors it was competing with. This allowed IDT/Centaur to take advantage of an established system platform (Intel's Socket 7).

=== Later developments ===
WinChip 2, an update of C6, retained the simple in-order execution pipeline of its predecessor, but added dual MMX/3DNow! processing units that could operate in superscalar execution. This made it the only non-AMD CPU on Socket 7 to support 3DNow! instructions. WinChip 2A added fractional multipliers and adopted a 100 MHz front side bus to improve memory access and L2 cache performance. It also adopted a performance rating nomenclature instead of reporting the real clock speed, similar to contemporary AMD and Cyrix processors.

Another revision, the WinChip 2B, was also planned. This featured a die shrink to 0.25 μm, but was only shipped in limited numbers.

A third model, the WinChip 3, was planned as well. This was meant to receive a doubled L1 cache, but the W3 CPU never made it to market.

=== Performance ===
Although the small die size and low power-usage made the processor notably inexpensive to manufacture, it never gained much market share. WinChip C6 was a competitor to the Intel Pentium and Pentium MMX, Cyrix 6x86, and AMD K5/K6. It performed adequately, but only in applications that used little floating point math. Its floating point performance was simply well below that of the Pentium and K6, being even slower than the Cyrix 6x86.

== Decline ==
The industry's move away from Socket 7 and the release of the Intel Celeron processor signalled the end of the WinChip. In 1999, the Centaur Technology division of IDT was sold to VIA. Although VIA branded the processors as "Cyrix", the company initially used technology similar to the WinChip in its Cyrix III line.

== Data ==
=== Winchip C6 (0.35 μm) ===
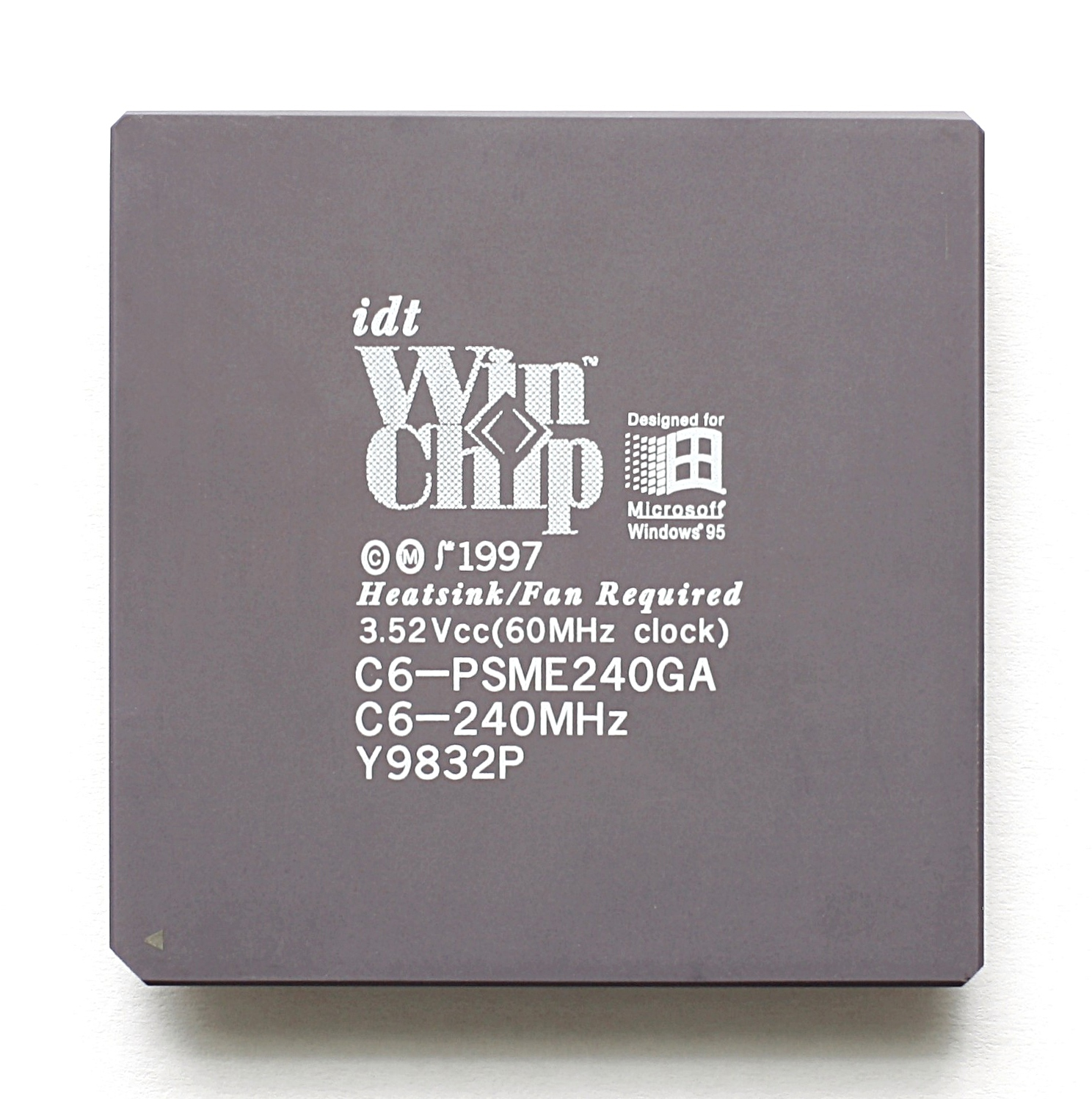
IDT WinChip C6

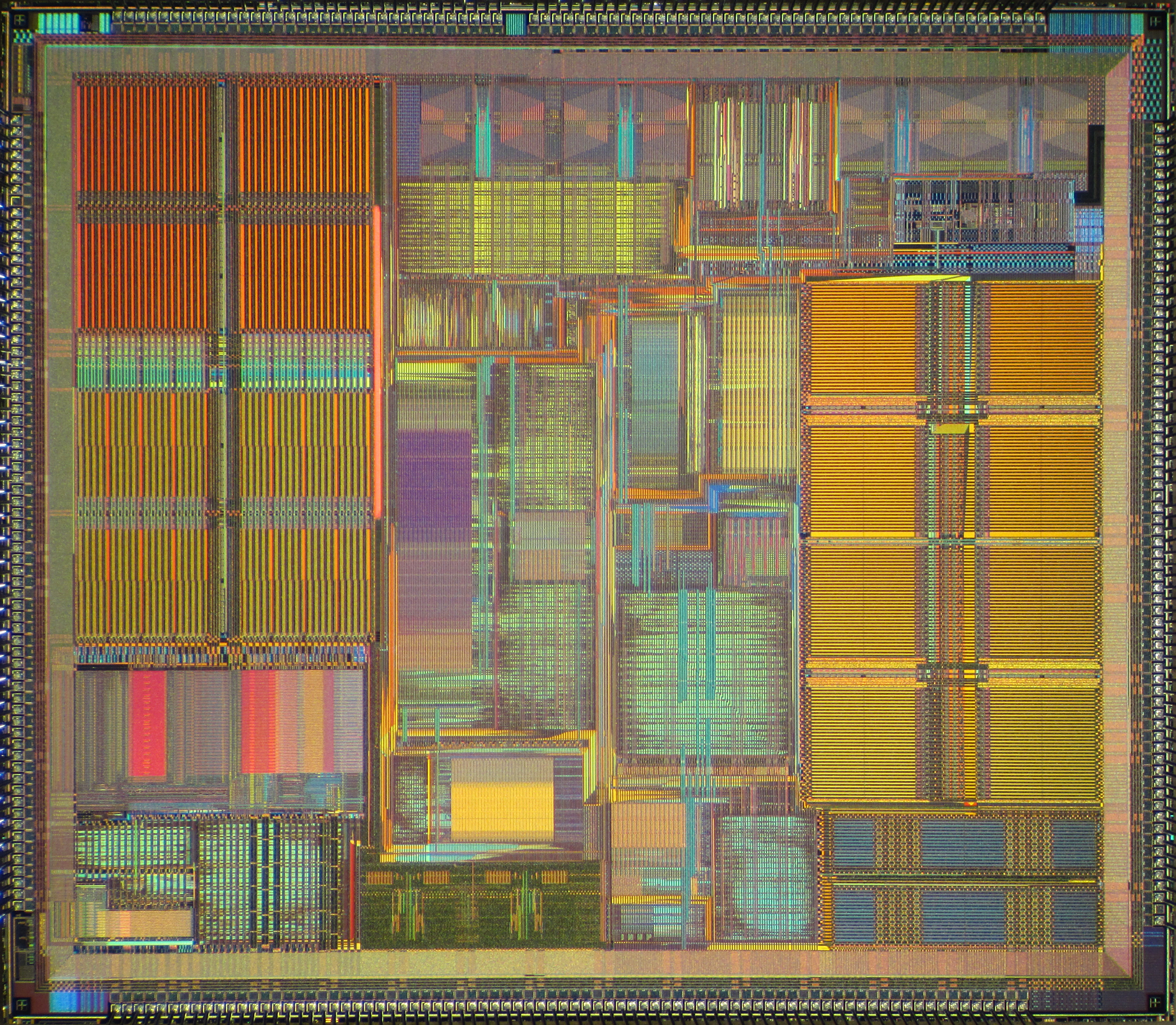
IDT WinChip C6 die shot

- All models supported MMX
- The 88 mm^{2} die was made using a 0.35 micron 4-layer metal CMOS technology.
- The 64 Kib L1 Cache of the WinChip C6 used a 32 KB 2-way set associative code cache and a 32 KB 2-way set associative data cache.

Processor model	Frequency	FSB	Mult.	L1 cache	TDP	CPU core voltage	Socket	Release date	Part number(s)	Introduction price
WinChip 180	180 MHz	60 MT/s	3	64 KiB	9.4 W	3.45—3.6 V	Socket 5; Socket 7; Super Socket 7; CPGA 296	13 October 1997	DS180GAEM	$90
WinChip 200	200 MHz	66 MT/s	3	64 KiB	10.4 W	3.45—3.6 V	Socket 5; Socket 7; Super Socket 7; CPGA 296	13 October 1997	DS200GAEM	$135
WinChip 225	225 MHz	75 MT/s	3	64 KiB	12.3 W	3.45—3.6 V	Socket 7; Super Socket 7; CPGA 296	13 October 1997	PSME225GA	
WinChip 240	240 MHz	60 MT/s	4	64 KiB	13.1 W	3.45—3.6 V	Socket 5; Socket 7; Super Socket 7; CPGA 296	November 1997?	PSME240GA	

=== WinChip 2 (0.35 μm) ===
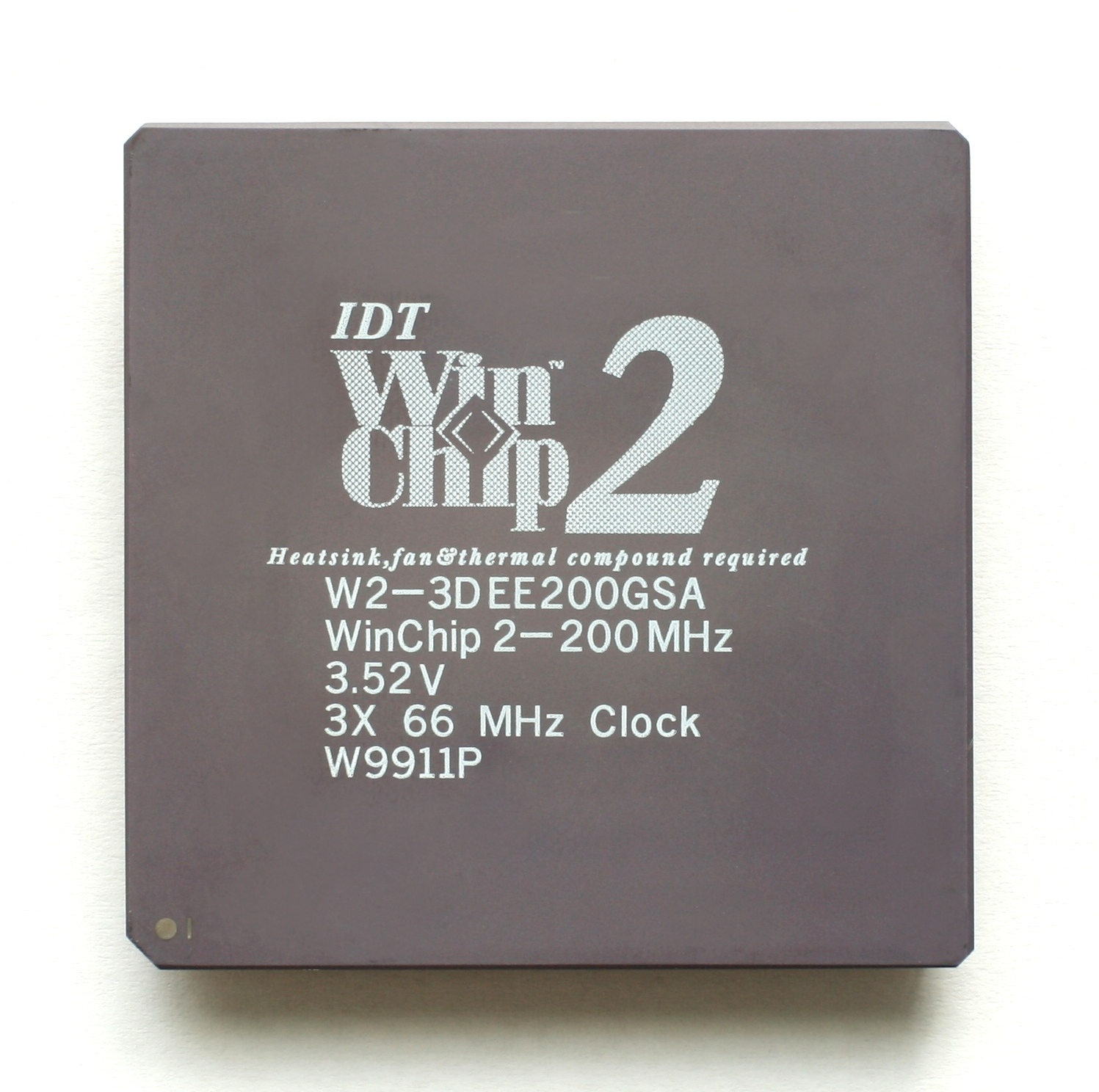
IDT WinChip2

- All models supported MMX and 3DNow!
- The 95 mm^{2} die was made using a 0.35 micron 5-layer metal CMOS technology.
- The 64 Kib L1 Cache of the WinChip 2 used a 32 KB 2-way set associative code cache and a 32 KB 4-way set associative data cache.

Processor model	Frequency	FSB	Mult.	L1 cache	TDP	CPU core voltage	Socket	Release date	Part number(s)	Introduction price
WinChip 2-200	200 MHz	66 MT/s	3	64 KiB	8.8 W	3.45—3.6 V	Socket 5; Socket 7; Super Socket 7; CPGA 296		3DEE200GSA; 3DFF200GSA	
WinChip 2-225	225 MHz	75 MT/s	3	64 KiB	10.0 W	3.45—3.6 V	Socket 7; Super Socket 7; CPGA 296		3DEE225GSA	
WinChip 2-240	240 MHz	60 MT/s	4	64 KiB	10.5 W	3.45—3.6 V	Socket 5; Socket 7; Super Socket 7; CPGA 296		3DEE240GSA	
WinChip 2-250	250 MHz	83 MT/s	3	64 KiB	10.9 W	3.45—3.6 V	Super Socket 7; CPGA 296	?		

=== WinChip 2A (0.35 μm) ===
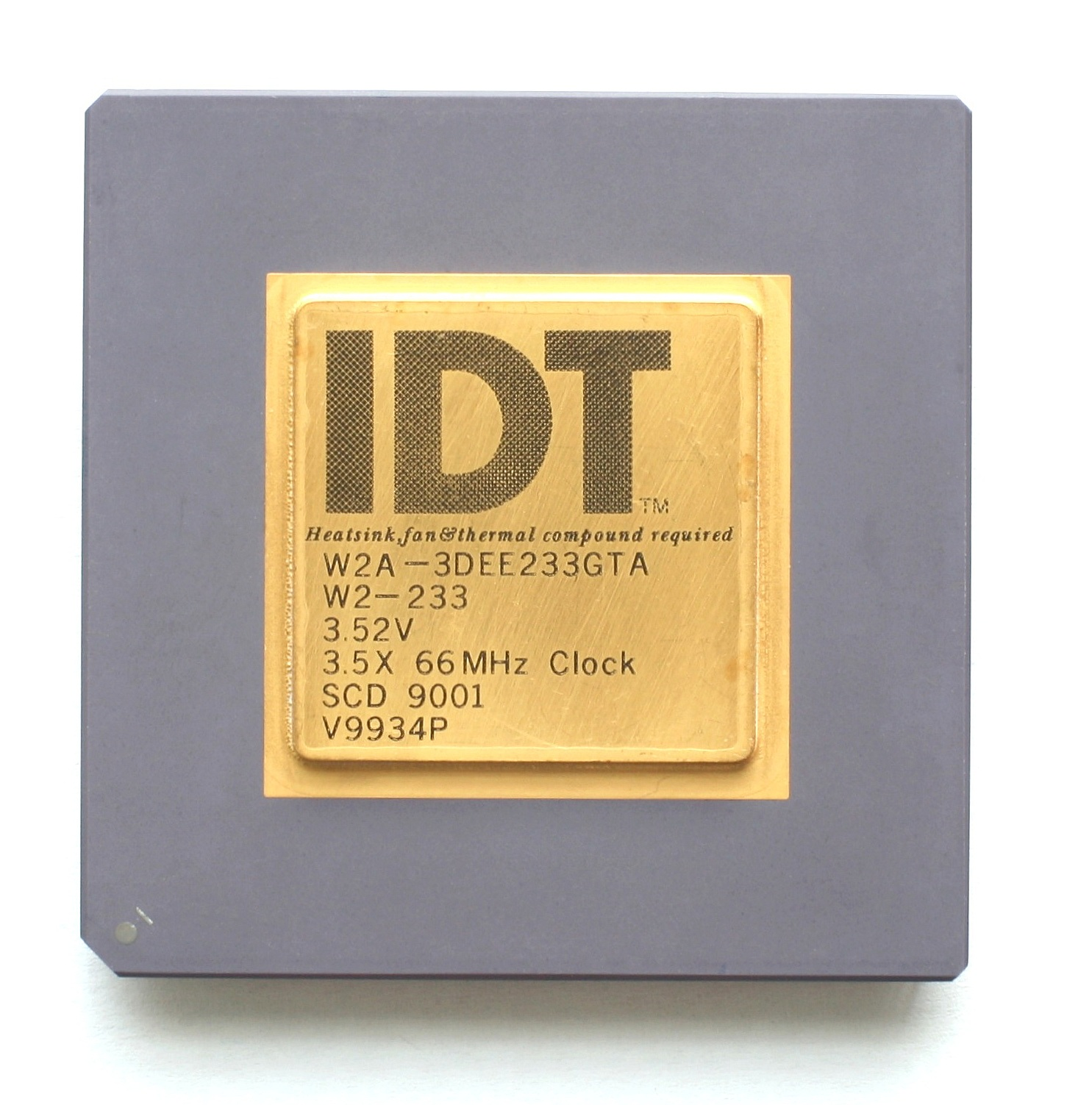
IDT WinChip2A

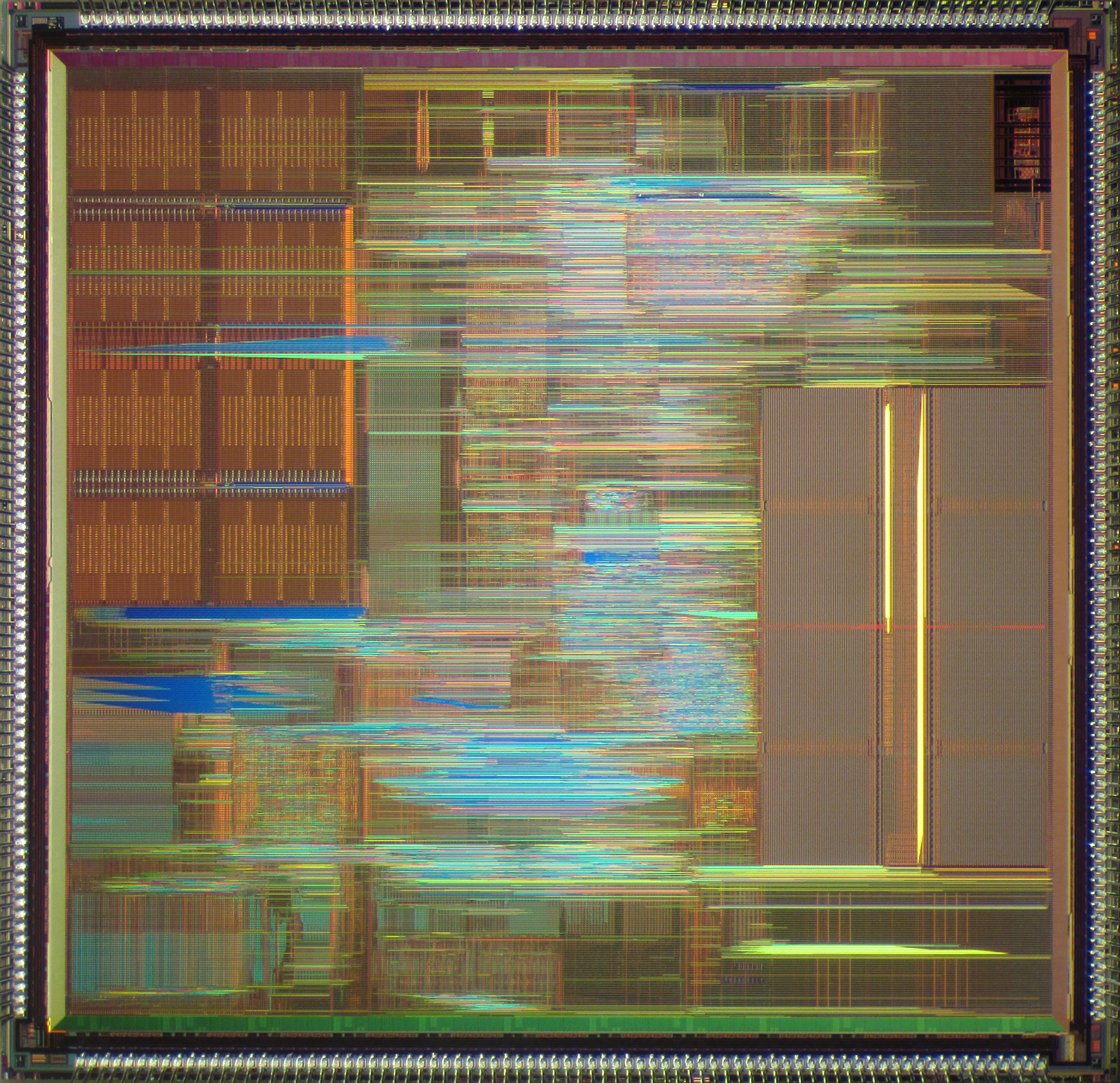
IDT WinChip2A die shot

- All models supported MMX and 3DNow!
- The 95 mm^{2} die was made using a 0.35 micron 5-layer metal CMOS technology.
- The 64 Kib L1 Cache of the WinChip 2A used a 32 KB 2-way set associative code cache and a 32 KB 4-way set associative data cache.

Processor model	Frequency	FSB	Mult.	L1 cache	TDP	CPU core voltage	Socket	Release date	Part number(s)	Introduction price
WinChip 2A-200	200 MHz	66 MT/s	3	64 KiB	12.0 W	3.45—3.6 V	Socket 5; Socket 7; Super Socket 7; CPGA 296	March 1999?	3DEE200GTA	
WinChip 2A-233	233 MHz	66 MT/s	3.5	64 KiB	13.0 W	3.45—3.6 V	Socket 5; Socket 7; Super Socket 7; CPGA 296	March 1999?	3DEE233GTA	
WinChip 2A-266	233 MHz	100 MT/s	2.33	64 KiB	14.0 W	3.45—3.6 V	Super Socket 7; CPGA 296	March 1999?	3DEE266GSA	
WinChip 2A-300	250 MHz	100 MT/s	2.5	64 KiB	16.0 W	3.45—3.6 V	Super Socket 7; CPGA 296		3DEE300GSA	

=== WinChip 2B (0.25 μm) ===
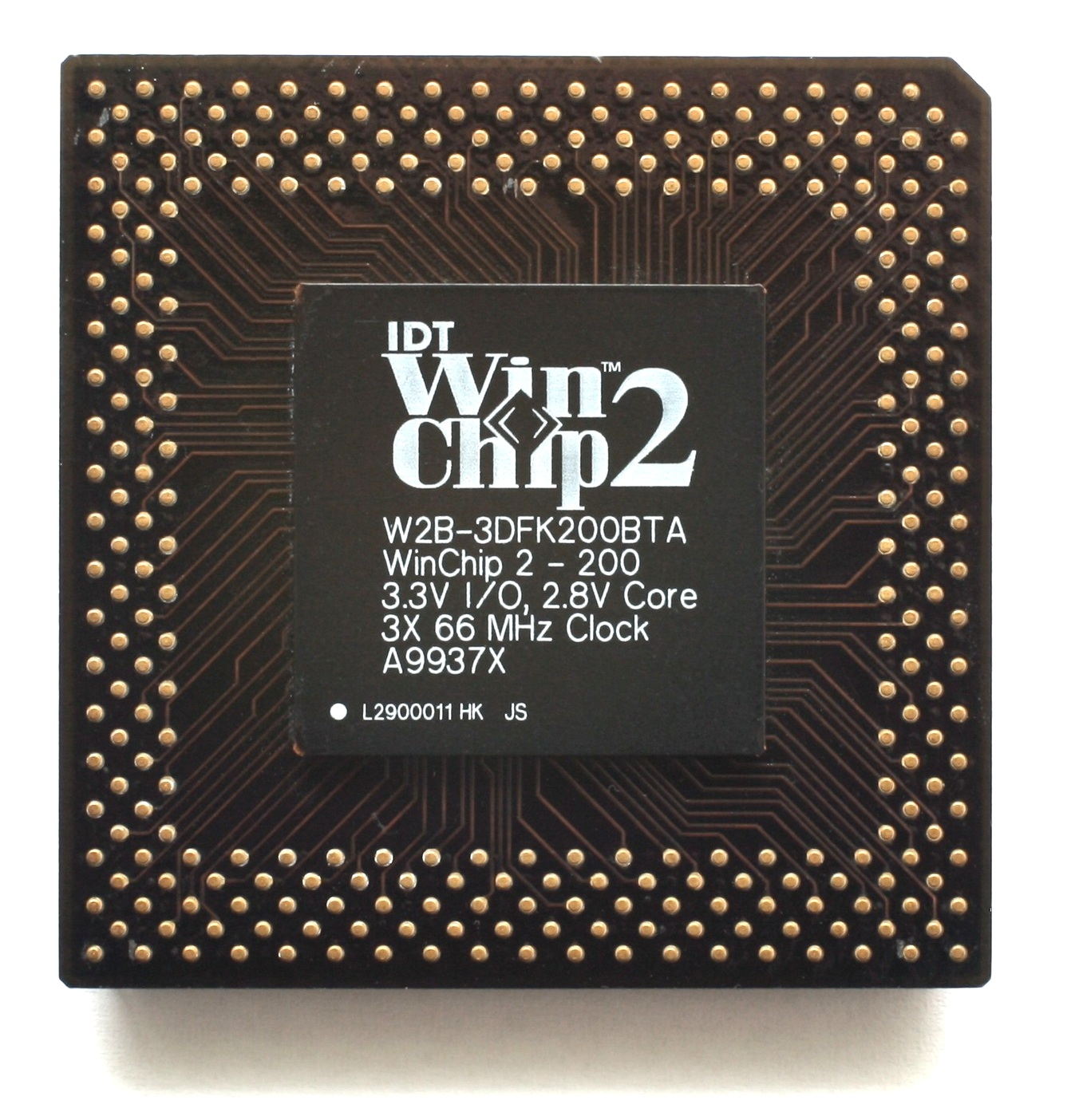
IDT WinChip2 W2B

- All models supported MMX and 3DNow!
- The 58 mm^{2} die was made using a 0.25 micron 5-layer metal CMOS technology.
- The 64 Kib L1 Cache of the WinChip 2B used a 32 KB 2-way set associative code cache and a 32 KB 4-way set associative data cache.
- Dual-voltage CPU: while the processor core operates at 2.8 V, the external input/output (I/O) voltages remain 3.3 V for backwards compatibility.

Processor model	Frequency	FSB	Mult.	L1 cache	TDP	CPU core voltage	Socket	Release date	Part number(s)	Introduction price
WinChip 2B-200	200 MHz	66 MT/s	3	64 KiB	6.3 W	2.7—2.9 V	Socket 7; Super Socket 7; PPGA 296		3DFK200BTA	
WinChip 2B-233	200 MHz	100 MT/s	2	64 KiB	6.3 W	2.7—2.9 V	Super Socket 7; PPGA 296			

=== WinChip 3 (0.25 μm) ===
- All models supported MMX and 3DNow!
- The 75 mm^{2} die was made using a 0.25 micron 5-layer metal CMOS technology.
- The 128 Kib L1 Cache of the WinChip 3 used a 64 KB 2-way set associative code cache and a 64 KB 4-way set associative data cache.
- Dual-voltage CPU: while the processor core operates at 2.8 volts, the external input/output (I/O) voltages remain 3.3 volts for backwards compatibility.

Processor model	Frequency	FSB	Mult.	L1 cache	TDP	CPU core voltage	Socket	Release date	Part number(s)	Introduction price
WinChip 3-233	200 MHz	66 MT/s	3	128 KiB	? W	2.7—2.9 V	Socket 7; Super Socket 7; CPGA 296			
WinChip 3-266	233 MHz	66 MT/s	3.5	128 KiB	8.4 W	2.7—2.9 V	Socket 7; Super Socket 7; CPGA 296	Samples only	FK233GDA	
WinChip 3-300	233 MHz	100 MT/s	2.33	128 KiB	8.4 W	2.7—2.9 V	Super Socket 7; CPGA 296	Samples only	FK300GDA	
WinChip 3-300	266 MHz	66 MT/s	4	128 KiB	9.3 W	2.7—2.9 V	Socket 7; Super Socket 7; CPGA 296			
WinChip 3-333	250 MHz	100 MT/s	2.5	128 KiB	8.8 W	2.7—2.9 V	Super Socket 7; CPGA 296			
WinChip 3-333	266 MHz	100 MT/s	2.66	128 KiB	9.3 W	2.7—2.9 V	Super Socket 7; CPGA 296			

== See also ==
- List of VIA microprocessors
