= Socket 5 =

CPU socket

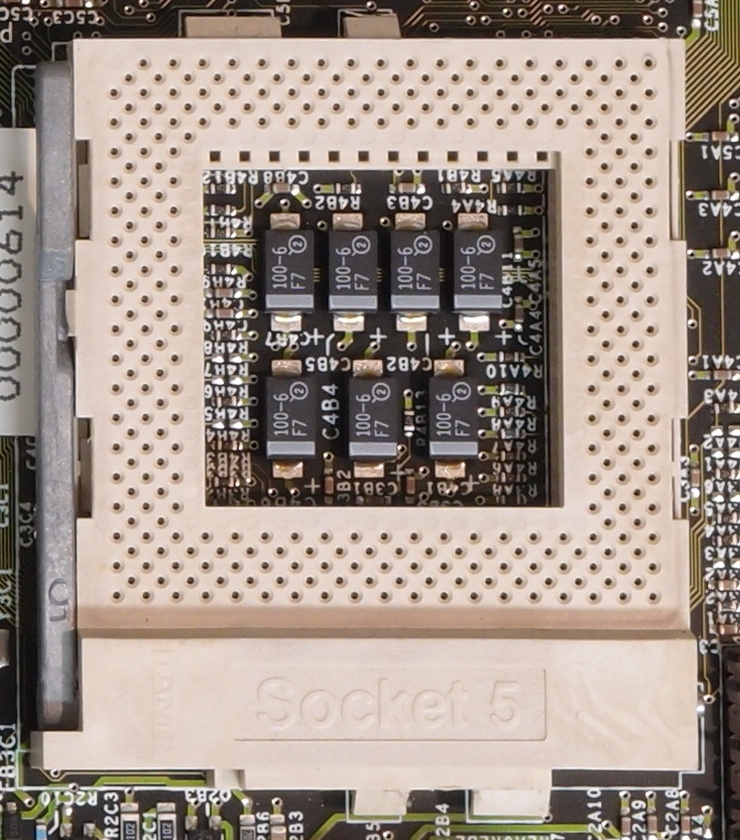
- Type: ZIF
- Chip form factors: SPGA
- Contacts: 320
- FSB protocol: proprietary
- FSB frequency: 50, 60, or 66 MT/s
- Voltage range: 3.1 to 3.6 V
- Processors: Intel P5 Pentium (75 - 133 MHz); Intel Pentium OverDrive (125 - 180 MHz); Intel Pentium OverDrive MMX (125 - 200 MHz); AMD K5 (PR75 - PR200); IDT WinChip (180 - 200 MHz); IDT WinChip-2 (200 - 240 MHz); IDT WinChip-2a (233 MHz) and compatible
- Predecessor: Socket 4
- Successor: Socket 7
- This article is part of the CPU socket series

Socket 5 was created for the second generation of Intel P5 Pentium processors operating at speeds from 75 to 133 MHz as well as some Pentium OverDrive and early Pentium MMX processors with core voltage 3.3 V. Released in March 1994, it superseded the earlier Socket 4. Consisting of 320 pins, this was the first socket to use a staggered pin grid array (SPGA), which allowed the chip's pins to be spaced closer together than earlier sockets. Socket 5 was replaced by Socket 7 in 1995.

== See also ==
- List of Intel microprocessors
- List of AMD microprocessors
