= Rise Technology =

Microprocessor manufacturer

- Industry: Microprocessor manufacturer
- Founded: 1993
- Defunct: 1999
- Headquarters: Santa Clara, California, U.S.
- Website: rise.com at the Wayback Machine (archived June 26, 1997)

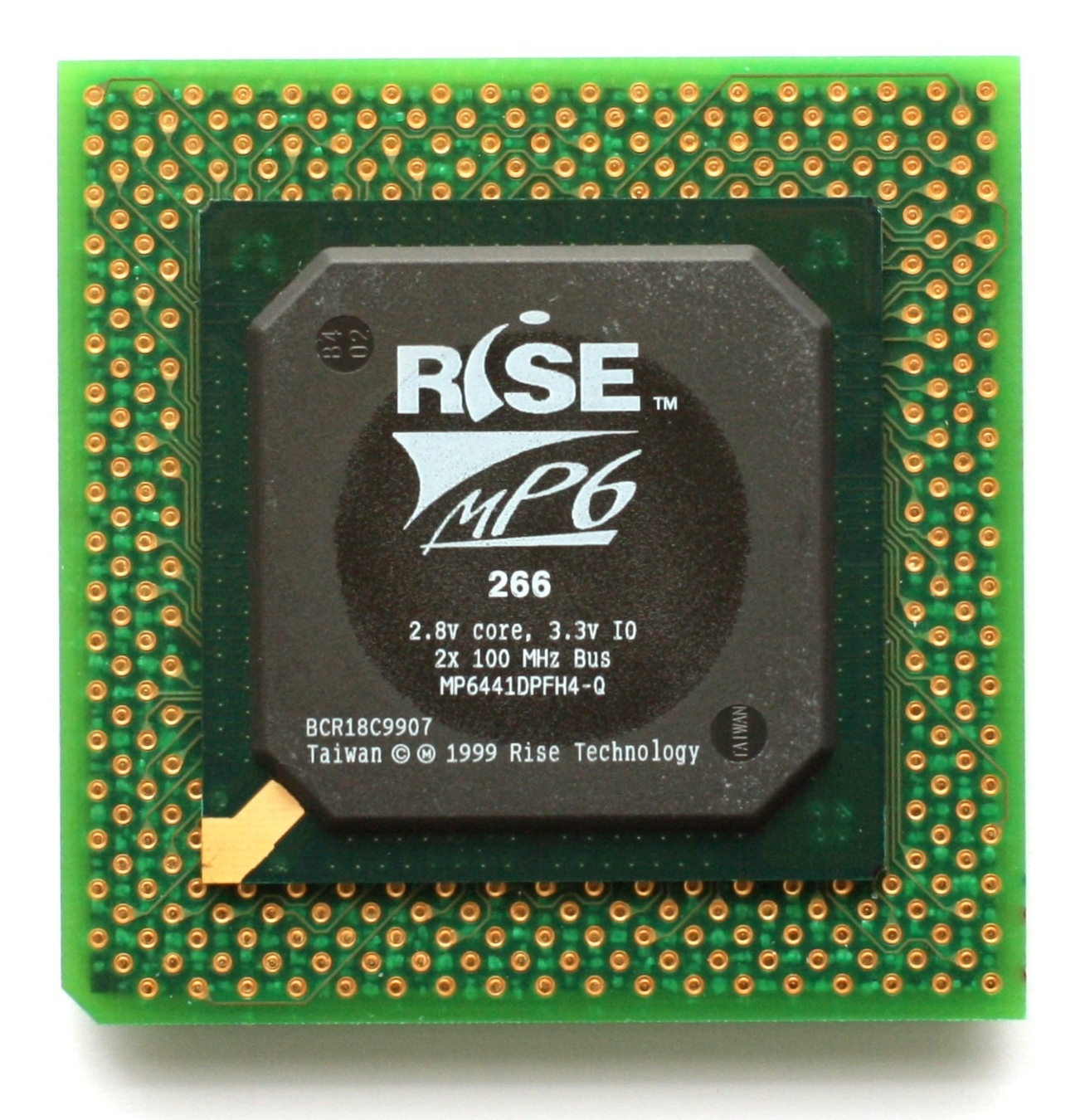
Rise mP6

Rise Technology was a short-lived microprocessor manufacturer that produced the Intel x86 MMX compatible mP6 processor. The mP6 was a microprocessor that was designed to perform a smaller number of types of computer instructions so that it can operate at a higher speed (perform more millions of instructions per second, or MIPS).

The Santa Clara, California based company was started by David Lin in 1993 with funding from 15 Taiwanese investors, including UMC, ACER and VIA Technologies. After multiple company restructurings, the mP6 was announced at the end of 1998 and went into small production in 1999. The device was meant for the low-end, low-power segment of laptop computers. Finding itself unable to compete in the computing market with the larger vendors (Intel and AMD), Rise re-targeted itself to set-top boxes and internet appliances. Towards that goal, Rise licensed their cores to STMicroelectronics. The company was acquired by SiS at the end of 1999.
