= Silicon Integrated Systems =

Company

Silicon Integrated Systems 矽統科技
- Type: Public
- Traded as: (TWSE: 2363)
- Founded: 1987; 39 years ago
- Headquarters: Hsinchu Science Park, Taiwan
- Number of employees: 1000
- Website: www.sis.com

Silicon Integrated Systems (SiS; Chinese: 矽統科技; pinyin: Xìtǒng Kējì) is a company that designs and manufactures integrated circuits, chipsets and components related to Human-Machine Interfaces (HMI). The company was founded in 1987 in Hsinchu Science Park, Taiwan.

== Business ==
In the late 1990s, SiS made the decision to invest in their own chip fabrication facilities. At the end of 1999, SiS acquired Rise Technology and its mP6 x86 core technology. Silicon Integrated Systems (SiS) acquired Hycon Technology on January 1, 2025. The acquisition involved SiS issuing 0.8713 shares for every Hycon share, totaling 27,755,080 shares.

== Mainboard chipsets ==
One of the most famous chipsets produced by SiS was the late 486-age chipset 496/497 which supported PCI bus among older ISA- and VLB-buses. Mainboards using this chipset and equipped with CPUs such as the Intel 80486DX4, AMD 5x86 or Cyrix Cx5x86 processors had performance and compatibility comparable with early Intel Pentium systems in addition to a lower price.

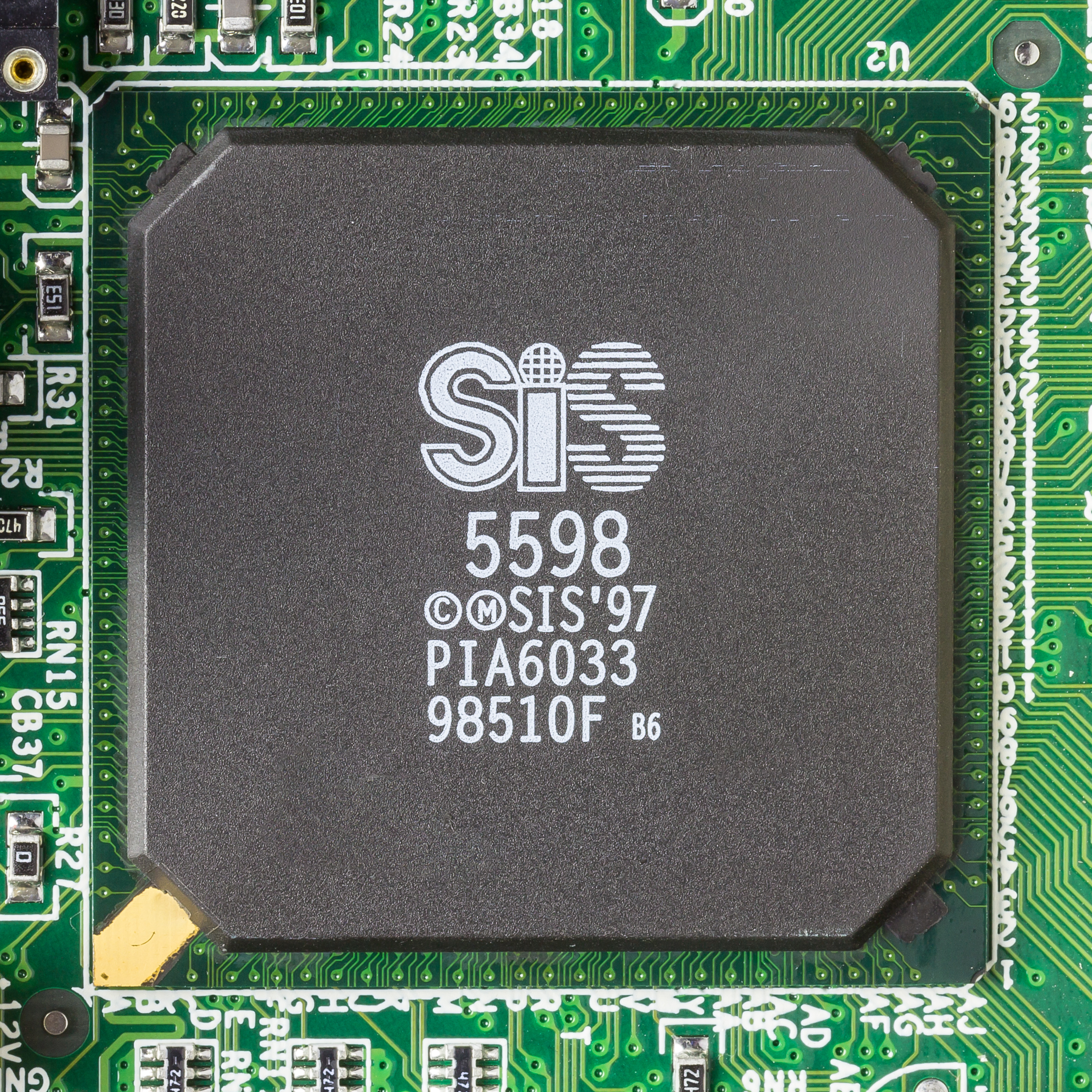
SiS 5598

After this late success, SiS continued positioning itself as a budget chipset producer. The company emphasized high integration to minimize the cost to implement their solutions. As such, SiS one-chip mainboard chipsets that included integrated video, such as the Socket 7-based SiS 5596, SiS 5598, and SiS 530 along with the Slot 1-based SiS 620. These were some of the first PC chipsets with such high integration. They allowed entire system solutions to be built with just a mainboard, system RAM, and a CPU.

=== 386 & 486 (Socket 1, 2, 3) ===
- SiS 310,320,330 "Rabbit"
- SiS 401/402 ISA
- SiS 406/411 EISA, Vesa Local Bus
- SiS 460 ISA, Vesa Local Bus
- SiS 461 ISA, Vesa Local Bus
- SiS 471 ISA, Vesa Local Bus
- SiS 496/497 ISA, VLB, PCI

Chipset	Release date	Part numbers	South Bridge	Socket	Processors	FSB	Memory types	Max. memory	Parity/ECC	L2 Cache Type	VLB support	PCI support
SiS 310, 320, 330	1991	SiS 85C310, SiS 85C320, SiS 85C330	N/A	132-pin PGA	386DX	25/33/40 MHz	FPM	32 MB	??	Async.	No	No
SiS 401/402		SiS 85C401, SiS 85C402	N/A	132-pin PGA, Socket 1/2/3	386DX, 5V 486	25/33/40/50 MHz	FPM	64 MB	Parity	Async.		No
SiS 406/411	1991?	SiS 85C406, SiS 85C411	N/A	132-pin PGA, Socket 1/2/3	386DX, 5V 486	25/33/40/50 MHz	FPM	64 MB	Parity	Async.		No
SiS 460	1993	SiS 85C460	N/A	132-pin PGA, Socket 1/2/3	386DX, 5V 486	25/33/40/50 MHz	FPM	64 MB	Parity	Async.	Yes	No
SiS 461		SiS 85C461	N/A	132-pin PGA, Socket 1/2/3	386DX, 5V 486	25/33/40/50 MHz	FPM	64 MB	Parity	Async.	Yes	No
SiS 471	1994	SiS 85C471	N/A	Socket 1/2/3	5 V/3.3 V 486, Am5x86, Cx5x86, Pentium Overdrive	25/33/40/50 MHz	FPM	128 MB	Parity	Async.	Yes	No
SiS 496/497	1995	SiS SiS85C496, SiS SiS85C497	SiS 497	Socket 1/2/3	5 V/3.3 V 486, Am5x86, Cx5x86, Pentium Overdrive	25/33/40/50 MHz	FPM, EDO	256 MB	Parity	Async.	Yes	2.0

=== Pentium (Socket 4,5,7) ===
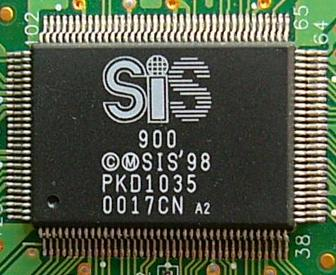
SiS LAN Chip SiS900

- SiS 501/502/503 ISA, PCI
- SiS 5511/5512/5513 ISA, PCI
- SiS 5571 ISA, PCI
- SiS 5581 ISA, PCI
- SiS 5582 ISA, PCI
- SiS 5591/5595 ISA, PCI, AGP

The SiS 530 (Sindbad) with SiS 5595 southbridge supported Socket 7, SDRAM 1.5 GB max., a bus frequency from 66 MHz to 124 MHz, and can have from 2 to 8 MiB shared memory for an integrated AGP SiS 6306 2D/3D graphics controller. Includes integrated UDMA66 IDE controller. mainboards using the SiS 530 were positioned as cheap office platforms and paired often with low-cost chips from Intel competitors, such as the AMD K6 series or Cyrix 6x86. The graphics controller had Direct3D 6.0 and OpenGL support, although it was a very low-performance product for 3D acceleration.

SiS 540 (Spartan) integrates SiS 300 graphics controller.

Chipset	Release date	Part numbers	South Bridge	Socket	Processors	FSB	Memory types	Max. memory	Max. cacheable	Parity/ECC	L2 Cache Type	PCI support	Graphics slot	IGP
SiS 501/502/503	1995	SiS 85C501, SiS 85C502, SiS 85C503	SiS 503	Socket 4 Socket 5/7	Pentium, AMD K5, Cyrix 6x86	50/60/66 MHz	FPM	128 MB	128 MB	N/A	Async.	2.0	N/A	No
SiS 5101/5102/5103	1995		SiS 5103	Socket 4 Socket 5/7	Pentium, AMD K5, Cyrix 6x86	50/60/66 MHz	FPM, EDO	512 MB	512 MB	N/A	Async.	2.0	N/A	No
SiS 5501/5502/5503	1995		SiS 5503	Socket 4 Socket 5/7	Pentium, AMD K5, Cyrix 6x86	50/60/66 MHz	FPM, EDO	512 MB	?	N/A	Async.	2.0	N/A	No
SiS 5511/5512/5513	1995		SiS 5513	Socket 5/7	Pentium, AMD K5, Cyrix 6x86	50/60/66 MHz	FPM, EDO	512 MB 1 GB may be possible	?	Parity	Async. / Pburst	2.1	N/A	No
SiS 5596/5513	1996		SiS 5513	Socket 5/7	Pentium, Pentium MMX, 6x86, AMD K5/K6, Rise mP6, IDT Winchip	50/60/66 MHz	FPM, EDO	512 MB		N/A	Async. / Pburst	2.1	N/A	SiS 6205
SiS 5571	1996		Northbridge integrated	Socket 7	Pentium, Pentium MMX, 6x86, AMD K5/K6, Rise mP6, IDT Winchip	50/60/66/75 MHz	FPM, EDO, SDRAM	384 MB	64 MB?	N/A	Async. / Pburst	2.1	N/A	No
SiS 5120	1997		Northbridge integrated	Socket 7	Pentium, Pentium MMX, 6x86, AMD K5/K6, Rise mP6, IDT Winchip	50/60/66/75 MHz	FPM, EDO, SDRAM	384 MB	128 MB	N/A	Async. / Pburst	2.1	N/A	No
SiS 5581	1997		Northbridge integrated	Socket 7	Pentium, Pentium MMX, 6x86, AMD K5/K6, Rise mP6, IDT Winchip	50/60/66/75 MHz	FPM, EDO, SDRAM	384 MB	128 MB	N/A	Async. / Pburst	2.1	N/A	No
SiS 5582	1997		Northbridge integrated	Socket 7	Pentium, Pentium MMX, 6x86, AMD K5/K6, Rise mP6, IDT Winchip	50/60/66/75 MHz	FPM, EDO, SDRAM	384 MB	128 MB	N/A	Async. / Pburst	2.1	N/A	No
SiS 5597	1997		Northbridge integrated	Socket 7	Pentium, Pentium MMX, 6x86, AMD K5/K6, Rise mP6, IDT Winchip	50/60/66/75 MHz	FPM, EDO, SDRAM	384 MB	128 MB	N/A	Async. / Pburst	2.1	N/A	SiS 5597
SiS 5598	1997		Northbridge integrated	Socket 7	Pentium, Pentium MMX, 6x86, AMD K5/K6, Rise mP6, IDT Winchip	50/60/66/75 MHz	FPM, EDO, SDRAM	384 MB	128 MB	N/A	Async. / Pburst	2.1	N/A	SiS 5598
SiS 5591/5595	1998		SiS 5595	Socket 7	Pentium, Pentium MMX, 6x86, AMD K5/K6, Rise mP6, IDT Winchip	50/60/66/75 MHz	FPM, EDO, SDRAM	768 MB	256 MB	N/A	Async. / Pburst	2.1	AGP 1×/2×	No
SiS 5592/5595	1998		SiS 5595	Socket 7	Pentium, Pentium MMX, 6x86, AMD K5/K6, Rise mP6, IDT Winchip	50/60/66/75 MHz	FPM, EDO, SDRAM	768 MB	256 MB	N/A	Async. / Pburst	2.1	AGP 1×/2×	No
SiS 530	1998		SiS 5595	Socket 7	Pentium, Pentium MMX, 6x86, AMD K5/K6, Rise mP6, IDT Winchip	66/75/83/90/95/100 MHz	FPM, EDO, SDRAM	1536 MB	256 MB	N/A	Async. / Pburst	2.2	N/A	SiS 6306
SiS 540	1999		Northbridge integrated	Socket 7	Pentium, Pentium MMX, 6x86, AMD K5/K6, Rise mP6, IDT Winchip	66/75/83/90/95/100 MHz	SDRAM, VCSDRAM	1536 MB	512 MB	ECC	Async. / Pburst	2.2	N/A	SiS 300

=== Socket 370, Slot 1 ===
- SiS 600/SiS 5595
- SiS 620/SiS 5595
- SiS 630 - includes North- and South bridges (SiS 960) and 2D/3D graphics controller (SiS 305) on one chip
- SiS 633
- SiS 635

Chipset	Release date	South Bridge	Socket	Processors	FSB	Memory types	Memory bus	Max. memory	Graphics slot	IGP
SiS 5600	1998	SiS 5595	Slot 1	Pentium II/III, Celeron	66/100 MHz	FPM, EDO, SDRAM	66/100 MHz SDR	1.5 GB	AGP 1×/2×	No
SiS 600	1998	SiS 5595	Slot 1	Pentium II/III, Celeron	66/100 MHz	FPM, EDO, SDRAM	66/100 MHz SDR	1.5 GB	AGP 1×/2×	No
SiS 620	Aug 1998	SiS 5595	Slot 1, Socket 370	Pentium II/III, Celeron	66/100 MHz	SDRAM	66/100 MHz SDR	1.5 GB	N/A	SiS 6306
SiS 630	2000	Northbridge integrated	Slot 1, Socket 370	Pentium II/III, Celeron	66/100/133 MHz	SDRAM, VCSDRAM	66/100/133 MHz SDR	1.5 GB	N/A	SiS305
SiS 630S	2000	Northbridge integrated	Slot 1, Socket 370	Pentium II/III, Celeron	66/100/133 MHz	SDRAM	66/100/133 MHz SDR	1.5 GB	AGP 2×/4×	SiS305
SiS 630ST	2001	Northbridge integrated	Socket 370	Pentium III, Tualatin, Celeron	66/100/133 MHz	SDRAM	66/100/133 MHz SDR	1.5 GB	AGP 2×/4×	SiS305
SiS 630E	2000	Northbridge integrated	Slot 1, Socket 370	Pentium II/III, Celeron	66/100/133 MHz	SDRAM	66/100/133 MHz SDR	1.5 GB	N/A	SiS305
SiS 630ET	2001	Northbridge integrated	Socket 370	Pentium III, Tualatin, Celeron	66/100/133 MHz	SDRAM	66/100/133 MHz SDR	1.5 GB	N/A	SiS305
SiS 633	2001	Northbridge integrated	Socket 370	Pentium III, Celeron	66/100/133 MHz	SDRAM	66/100/133 MHz SDR	1.5 GB	AGP 2×/4×	SiS305
SiS 633T	2001	Northbridge integrated	Socket 370	Pentium III, Tualatin, Celeron	66/100/133 MHz	SDRAM	66/100/133 MHz SDR	1.5 GB	AGP 2×/4×	SiS305
SiS 635	2001	Northbridge integrated	Socket 370	Pentium III, Celeron	66/100/133 MHz	SDRAM, DDR	100/133 MHz SDR, 200/266 MHz DDR	1.5 GB	AGP 2×/4×	No
SiS 635T	2001	Northbridge integrated	Socket 370	Pentium III, Tualatin, Celeron	66/100/133 MHz	SDRAM, DDR	100/133 MHz SDR, 200/266 MHz DDR	1.5 GB	AGP 2×/4×	No
SiS 640T	Never released	SiS961, SiS961B	Socket 370	Pentium III, Tualatin, Celeron	66/100/133 MHz	SDRAM, DDR	100/133 MHz SDR, 200/266 MHz DDR?	1.5 GB	AGP 2×/4×?	SiS315

=== Socket 478, Socket 775 ===
SiS and ALi were the only two companies initially awarded licenses to produce third party chipsets for the Pentium 4. SiS developed the 648 chipset with this license (SiS 648 B Stepping supports Intel Hyper-Threading CPU on some motherboards like MSI 648 Max).

Chipset	Release date	South Bridge	Socket	Processors	FSB	Memory types	Memory bus	Max. memory	Graphics slot	IGP
SiS 645	2001	SiS961, SiS961B	Socket 423, Socket 478	Pentium 4, Celeron	400 MHz	SDR SDRAM, DDR SDRAM	100/133 MHz SDR, 200/266/333 MHz DDR	3 GB	AGP 2×/4×	No
SiS 645DX	2002	SiS961, SiS962, SiS962L	Socket 478	Pentium 4, Celeron	400/533 MHz	SDR SDRAM, DDR SDRAM	100/133 MHz SDR, 200/266/333 MHz DDR	3 GB	AGP 2×/4×	No
SiS 650	2001	SiS961, SiS961B	Socket 423, Socket 478	Pentium 4, Celeron	400 MHz	SDR SDRAM, DDR SDRAM	100/133 MHz SDR, 200/266 MHz DDR	3 GB	AGP 2×/4×	SiS315
SiS 650GX		SiS961, SiS961B	Socket 423, Socket 478	Pentium 4, Celeron	400 MHz	SDR SDRAM, DDR SDRAM	100/133 MHz SDR, 200/266/333 MHz DDR	3 GB	AGP 2×/4×	SiS315
SiS 651		SiS962, SiS962L	Socket 478	Pentium 4, Celeron	400/533 MHz	SDR SDRAM, DDR SDRAM	100/133 MHz SDR, 200/266/333 MHz DDR	3 GB	AGP 2×/4×	SiS315
SiS 648		SiS963, SiS963L	Socket 478	Pentium 4, Celeron	400/533 MHz	DDR SDRAM	200/266/333 MHz DDR	3 GB	AGP 4×/8×	No
SiS 648FX	2003	SiS963, SiS963L, SiS964	Socket 478, Socket 775	Pentium 4, Pentium 4 EE, Celeron, Celeron D	400/533/800 MHz	DDR SDRAM	200/266/333/400 MHz DDR	3 GB	AGP 4×/8×	No
SiS 655	2003	SiS963, SiS963L	Socket 478, Socket 775	Pentium 4, Celeron	400/533 MHz	Dual Channel DDR SDRAM	266/333/400 MHz DDR	4 GB	AGP 4×/8×	No
SiS 655FX		SiS964, SiS964L	Socket 478	Pentium 4, Pentium 4 EE, Celeron, Celeron D	400/533/800 MHz	Dual Channel DDR SDRAM	266/333/400 MHz DDR	4 GB	AGP 4×/8×	No
SiS 655TX		SiS964, SiS964L	Socket 478	Pentium 4, Pentium 4 EE, Celeron, Celeron D	400/533/800 MHz	Dual Channel DDR SDRAM	266/333/400 MHz DDR	4 GB	AGP 4×/8×	No
SiS 661FX	2003	SiS964, SiS964L	Socket 478, Socket 775	Pentium 4, Pentium 4 EE, Pentium D, Celeron, Celeron D	400/533/800 MHz	DDR SDRAM	266/333/400 MHz DDR	3 GB	AGP 4×/8×	Mirage
SiS 661GX		SiS964, SiS964L	Socket 478, Socket 775	Pentium 4, Pentium 4 EE, Pentium D, Celeron, Celeron D	400/533/800 MHz	DDR SDRAM	266/333/400 MHz DDR	3 GB	AGP 4×/8×	Mirage
SiS 656		SiS965, SiS965L	Socket 775	Pentium 4, Pentium 4 EE, Celeron D	533/800 MHz	Dual Channel DDR/DDR2 SDRAM	266/333/400 MHz DDR, 400/533 MHz DDR2	4 GB	PCI-E x16	No
SiS 656FX		SiS966, SiS966L	Socket 775	Pentium 4, Pentium 4 EE, Pentium D, Celeron D	533/800 MHz	Dual Channel DDR/DDR2 SDRAM	266/333/400 MHz DDR, 400/533/667 MHz DDR2	4 GB	PCI-E x16	No
SiS 649		SiS965, SiS965L	Socket 775	Pentium 4, Pentium 4 EE, Pentium D, Celeron, Celeron D	400/533/800 MHz	DDR SDRAM, DDR2 SDRAM	200/266/333/400 MHz DDR, 400/533 MHz DDR2	2 GB	PCI-E x16	No
SiS 649FX		SiS966, SiS966L	Socket 775	Pentium 4, Pentium 4 EE, Pentium D, Celeron, Celeron D	400/533/800 MHz	DDR SDRAM, DDR2 SDRAM	200/266/333/400 MHz DDR, 400/533 MHz DDR2	2 GB	PCI-E x16	No
SiS 649DX		SiS966, SiS966L	Socket 775	Pentium 4, Pentium 4 EE, Pentium D, Celeron, Celeron D	400/533/800 MHz	DDR2 SDRAM	400/533 MHz DDR2	2 GB	PCI-E x16	No
SiS 662		SiS966, SiS966L	Socket 775	Pentium 4, Pentium 4 EE, Pentium D, Core 2 Duo, Pentium Dual Core, Celeron, Celeron D	533/800 MHz	DDR2 SDRAM	400/533/667 MHz DDR2	2 GB	PCI-E x16	Mirage 1
SiS 671		SiS968	Socket 775	Pentium 4, Pentium 4 EE, Pentium D, Core 2 Duo, Pentium Dual Core, Celeron, Celeron D	533/800/1066 MHz	DDR2 SDRAM	400/533/667 MHz DDR2	4 GB	PCI-E x16	SiS351 (Mirage 3)
SiS 671FX		SiS968	Socket 775		533/800/1066 MHz	DDR2 SDRAM	400/533/667 MHz DDR2	4 GB	PCI-E x16	SiS351 (Mirage 3)
SiS 671DX		SiS968	Socket 775		533/800/1066 MHz	DDR2 SDRAM	400/533/667 MHz DDR2	4 GB	PCI-E x16	SiS351 (Mirage 3)
SiS 672		SiS968	Socket 775	533/800 MHz		DDR2 SDRAM	400/533/667 MHz DDR2	4 GB	PCI-E x16	SiS351 (Mirage 3)
SiS R658		SiS963, SiS963L	Socket 478	Pentium 4, Celeron	400/533 MHz	Dual Channel RDRAM	PC1066 RDRAM/RIMM 4200/4800	4 GB (1 GB per Channel)	AGP 4×/8×	No

=== Socket A (Socket 462), Slot A ===
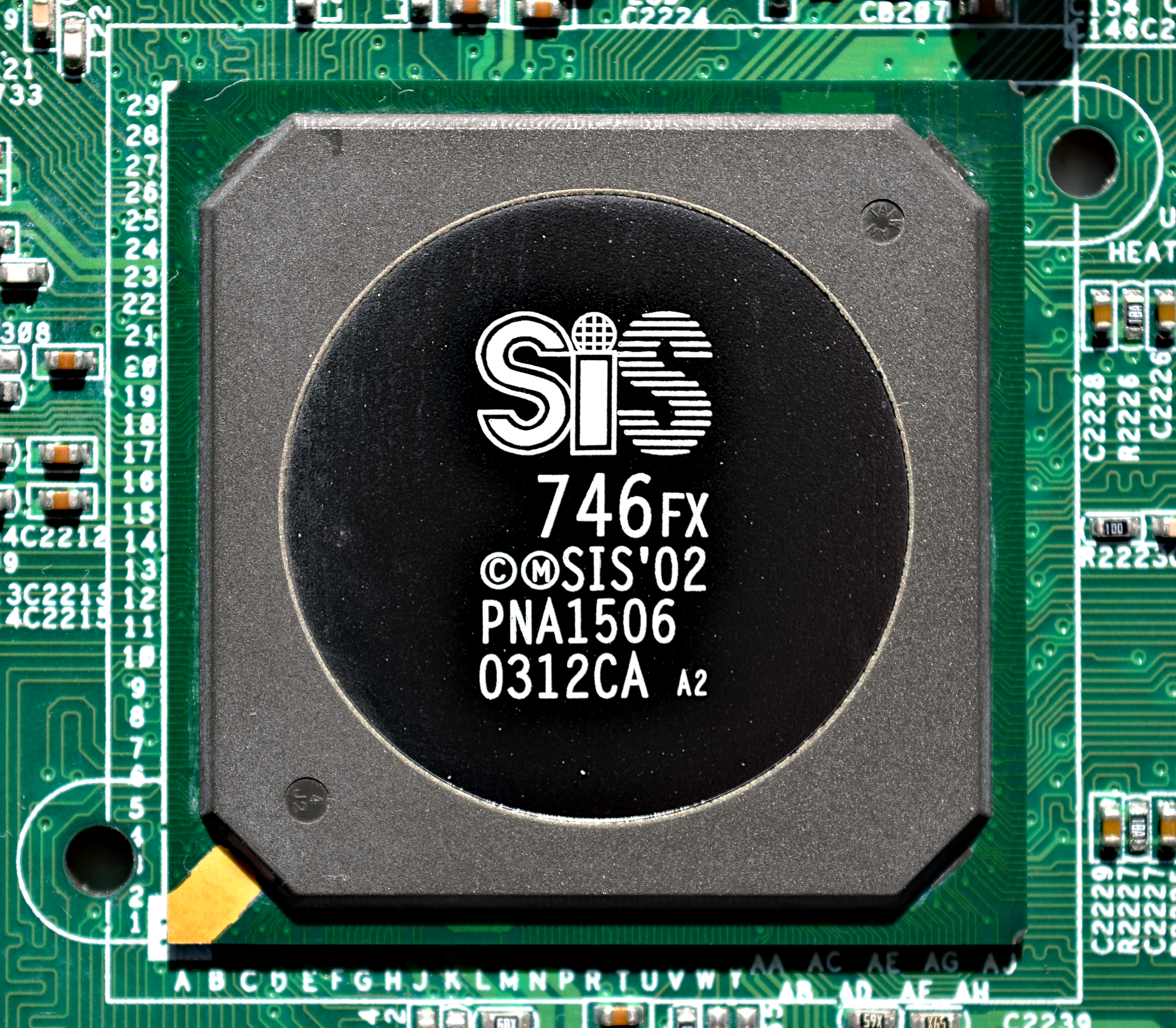
SiS 746FX

Chipset	Release date	Southbridge	Processors	FSB	Memory types	Memory bus	Max. memory	AGP	IGP
SiS 730	Dec 2000	Northbridge integrated	Slot A, Socket A	100/133 MHz	SDR SDRAM	100/133 MHz SDR	1.5 GB	2×/4×	SiS305
SiS 733		Northbridge integrated	Slot A, Socket A	200/266 MHz	SDR SDRAM	100/133 MHz SDR	1.5 GB	2×/4×	No
SiS 735		Northbridge integrated	Slot A, Socket A	200/266 MHz	SDR SDRAM, DDR SDRAM	100/133 MHz SDR, 200/266 MHz DDR	1.5 GB	2×/4×	No
SiS 740		SiS961, SiS962L	Socket A	200/266 MHz	SDR SDRAM, DDR SDRAM	100/133 MHz SDR, 200/266 MHz DDR	1.5 GB	2×/4×	SiS315
SiS 745	2001	Northbridge integrated	Socket A	200/266 MHz	SDR SDRAM, DDR SDRAM	100/133 MHz SDR, 200/266/333 MHz DDR	3 GB	2×/4×	No
SiS 746		SiS963, SiS963L	Socket A	200/266 MHz	DDR SDRAM	200/266/333 MHz DDR	3 GB	4×/8×	No
SiS 746FX		SiS963, SiS963L	Socket A	200/266/333 MHz	DDR SDRAM	200/266/333/400 MHz DDR	3 GB	4×/8×	No
SiS 748	2003	SiS963, SiS963L	Socket A	200/266/333/400 MHz	DDR SDRAM	200/266/333/400 MHz DDR	3 GB	4×/8×	No
SiS 741GX	2003	SiS964, SiS964L	Socket A	266/333 MHz	DDR SDRAM	266/333 MHz DDR	3 GB	4×/8×	Mirage
SiS 741	2003	SiS964, SiS964L	Socket A	266/333/400 MHz	DDR SDRAM	266/333/400 MHz DDR	3 GB	4×/8×	Mirage

=== Socket 940, 754, 939, AM2 ===
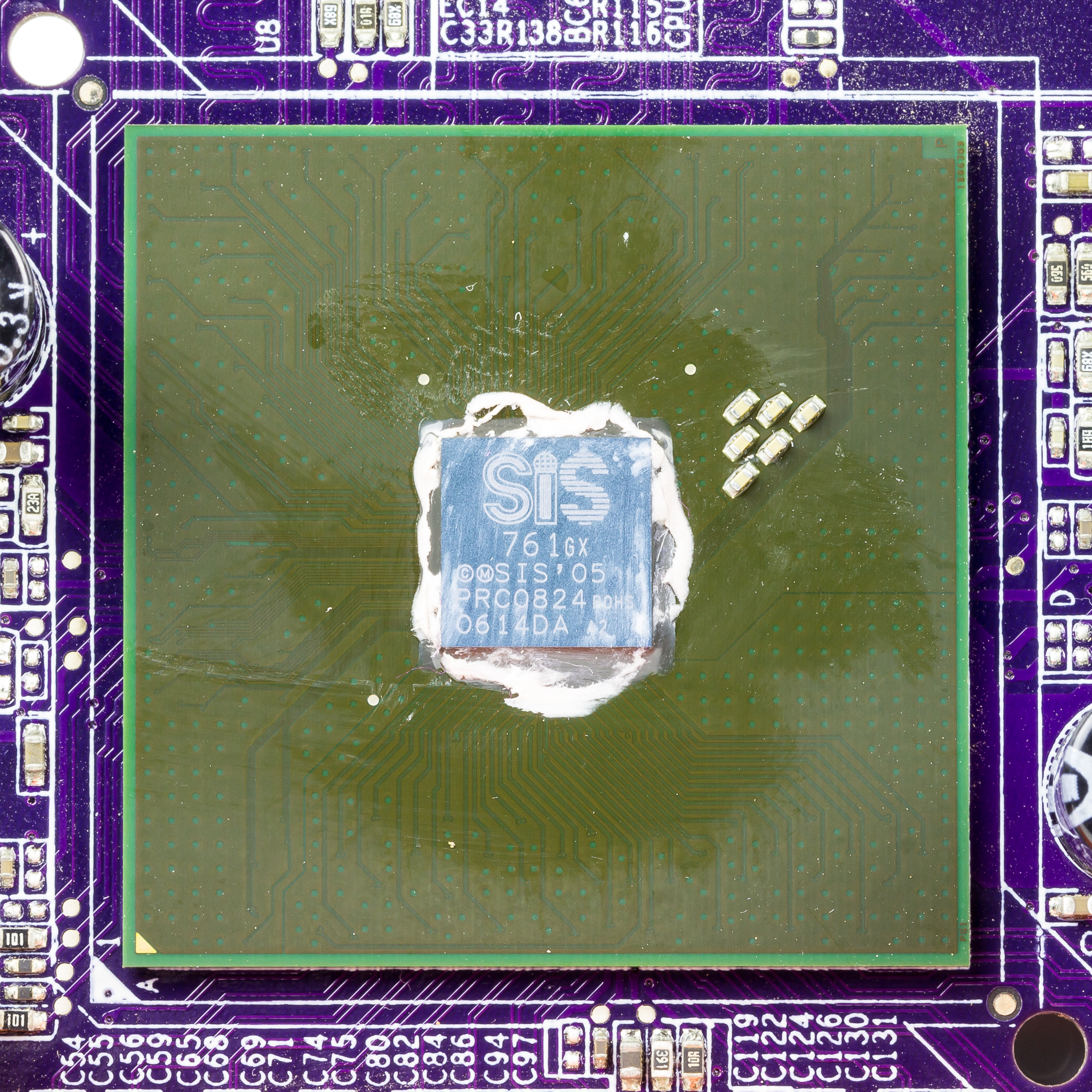
SiS 761GX

Memory support is dependent on the CPU

Chipset	Release date	Southbridge	Processors	HT	Graphics slot	IGP
SiS 755	2003	SiS963, SiS963L, SiS964, SiS964L	Socket 754	HT 800	AGP 4×/8×	No
SiS 755FX	2004	SiS964, SiS964L	Socket 939	HT 1000	AGP 4×/8×	No
SiS 760	2003	SiS964, SiS964L	Socket 754	HT 800	AGP 4×/8×	Mirage 2
SiS 760GX	2004	SiS964, SiS964L	Socket 754, Socket 939	HT 800	AGP 4×/8×	Mirage 2
SiS 756	2004	SiS965, SiS965L	Socket 754, Socket 939	HT 1000	PCI-E x16	No
SiS 761GX	2005	SiS964, SiS964L, SiS965, SiS965L	Socket 754, Socket 939, Socket AM2	HT 1000	PCI-E x16	Mirage 1
SiS 771	2006	SiS966, SiS966L, SiS968	Socket AM2	HT 1000	PCI-E x16	SiS351 (Mirage 3)

SiS created a multimedia chipset for the Xbox 360.

== Southbridge chips ==
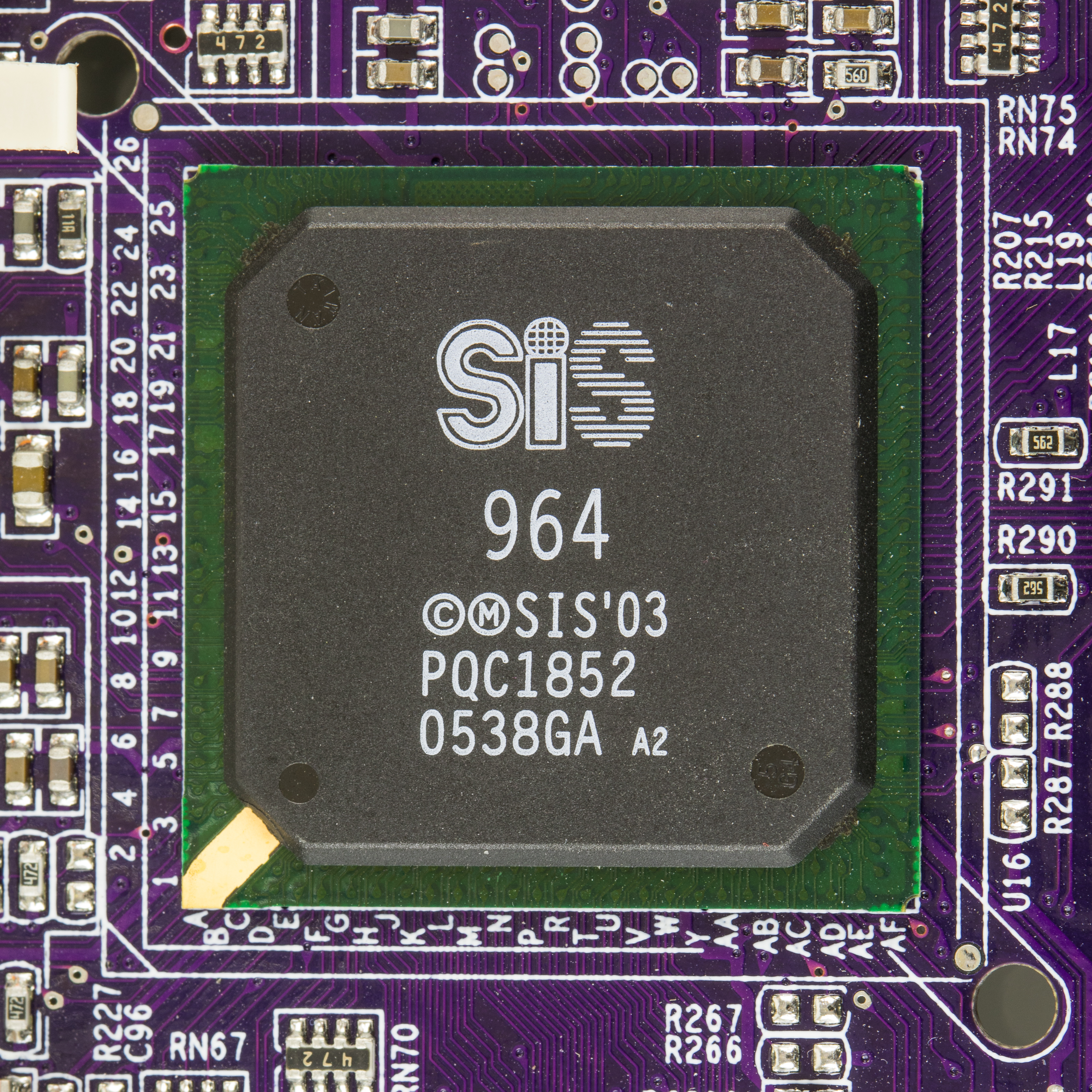
SiS 964

Paired with later SiS chipsets, such as the 661GX/761GX, which adopt a standard two-chip chipset design (instead of single-chip, like the older SiS 630/730 series chipsets). SiS southbridges can handle IDE, LAN (accompanied by a PHY chip), audio (with an AC'97 codec), along with other types of I/O. SiS' proprietary MuTIOL interconnect connects the southbridge chip to the northbridge, which contains the RAM controller (for chipsets targeted at Intel platforms) and interfaces with the CPU.

Southbridge	Release date	NB/SB Interconnect	PCI Express/Ports	Serial ATA/RAID	Parallel ATA	USB	Audio	LAN MAC	IEEE 1394
SiS 497	1995	VLB	N/A	N/A	4x PIOATA Devices	N/A	N/A	N/A	No
SiS 503	1995	Local Bus, PCI	N/A	N/A	N/A	N/A	N/A	N/A	No
SiS 5103	1995	Local Bus, PCI	N/A	N/A	4x PIO/WDMA ATA Devices	N/A	N/A	N/A	No
SiS 5503	1995	Local Bus, PCI	N/A	N/A	4x PIO/WDMA ATA Devices	N/A	N/A	N/A	No
SiS 5513	1995	Local Bus, PCI	N/A	N/A	4x PIO/WDMA ATA Devices	N/A	N/A	N/A	No
SiS 5595	1997	PCI	N/A	N/A	4x ATA/33 Devices	1.1, 2 ports	N/A	N/A	No
SiS 961	2001	MuTIOL®, 533MB/s	N/A	N/A	4x ATA/100 Devices	1.1, 6 ports	AC'97	10/100	No
SiS 961B	?	MuTIOL®, 533MB/s	N/A	N/A	4x ATA/133 Devices	1.1, 6 ports	AC'97	10/100	No
SiS 962	2002	MuTIOL®, 533MB/s	N/A	N/A	4x ATA/133 Devices	2.0, 6 ports	AC'97	10/100	Yes
SiS 962L	2002	MuTIOL®, 533MB/s	N/A	N/A	4x ATA/133 Devices	2.0, 6 ports	AC'97	10/100	No
SiS 963	2002	MuTIOL® 1G, 1GB/s	N/A	N/A	4x ATA/133 Devices	2.0, 6 ports	AC'97	10/100	Yes
SiS 963L	2002	MuTIOL® 1G, 1GB/s	N/A	N/A	4x ATA/133 Devices	2.0, 6 ports	AC'97	10/100	No
SiS 964	2003	MuTIOL® 1G, 1GB/s	N/A	2x SATA/150, RAID 0,1,JBOD	4x ATA/133 Devices	2.0, 8 ports	AC'97	10/100	No
SiS 964L	2003	MuTIOL® 1G, 1GB/s	N/A	2x SATA/150, RAID 0,1,JBOD	4x ATA/133 Devices	2.0, 8 ports	AC'97	10/100	No
SiS 965	2005?	MuTIOL® 1G, 1GB/s	PCIe x1, 2 lanes	4x SATA/150, RAID 0,1,0+1,JBOD	4x ATA/133 Devices	2.0, 8 ports	AC'97	10/100/1000 (SiS 191)	
SiS 965L	2005?	MuTIOL® 1G, 1GB/s	PCIe x1, 2 lanes	2x SATA/150, RAID 0,1,JBOD	4x ATA/133 Devices	2.0, 8 ports	AC'97	10/100 (SiS 190)	
SiS 966	2005?	MuTIOL® 1G, 1GB/s	PCIe x1, 2 lanes	4x SATA/150 (AHCI), RAID 0,1,0+1,JBOD	4x ATA/133 Devices	2.0, 8 ports	AC'97/HD Audio	10/100/1000 (SiS 191)	No
SiS 966L	2005?	MuTIOL® 1G, 1GB/s	PCIe x1, 2 lanes	2x SATA/150 (AHCI), RAID 0,1,JBOD	4x ATA/133 Devices	2.0, 8 ports	AC'97/HD Audio	10/100 (SiS 190)	
SiS 968	2007?	MuTIOL® 1G, 1GB/s	PCIe x1, 2 lanes	2x SATA/300 (AHCI), RAID 0,1,JBOD	2x ATA/133 Devices	2.0, 8 ports	HD Audio	10/100/1000	No

== Graphics chipsets ==
- SiS 6201
- SiS 6202
- SiS 6205
- SiS 6215
- SiS 6225
- SiS 6306
- SiS 6326
- SiS 300
- SiS 305
- SiS 315
- SiS 320 (Xabre 80)
- SiS 330 (Mirage IGP)
- SiS 340 (Xabre 200)
- SiS 360 (Xabre 400)
- SiS 380 (Xabre 600)

=== Discrete 3D Graphics chips ===
Model	Launch	Fab (nm)	Bus interface	Core clock (MHz)	Memory clock (MHz)	Core config^{1}	Fillrate				Memory				API support	
Model	Launch	Fab (nm)	Bus interface	Core clock (MHz)	Memory clock (MHz)	Core config^{1}	MOperations/s	MPixels/s	MTexels/s	MVertices/s	Size (MB)	Bandwidth (GB/s)	Bus type	Bus width (bit)	Direct3D	OpenGL
SiS 6326	1997		AGP 1× PCI	40	45-80 45–90 66–133	1:0:1:1	40	40	40	0	2-8	0.36-0.64 0.36-0.72 0.53-1.06	FPM EDO SDR	64	5.0	N/A
SiS 300	2000	250 nm	AGP 4× PCI	125	166	1:0:1:1	125	125	125	0	64	2.66	SDR	128	6.0	1.1
SiS 305	2000	250 nm	AGP 4× PCI	125	125	1:0:1:1	125	125	125	0	32	1.00	SDR	64	6.0	1.1
SiS 315	2001		AGP 4× PCI	166	166 333	2:0:4:2	333	333	667	0	64	2.66 5.33	SDR DDR	128	7.0	1.3
SiS 315E	2001		AGP 4× PCI	143	143 286	2:0:2:2	286	286	286	0	32	1.14 2.28	SDR DDR	64	7.0	1.3
Xabre 80	2002	150 nm	AGP 4×	200	333	4:1:8:4	800	800	1600	50	64	5.33	DDR	128	8.1	1.3
Xabre 200	2002	150 nm	AGP 8×	200	400	4:1:8:4	800	800	1600	50	32 64	6.40	DDR	128	8.1	1.3
Xabre 400	2002	150 nm	AGP 8×	250	400	4:1:8:4	1000	1000	2000	67.5	64 128	8.00	DDR	128	8.1	1.3
Xabre 600	2002	130 nm	AGP 8×	300	600	4:1:8:4	1200	1200	2400	75	64 128	9.60	DDR	128	8.1	1.3

=== Integrated 3D Graphics ===
Model	Core	Launch	Fab (nm)	Bus interface	Core clock (MHz)	Memory clock (MHz)	Core config^{1}	Fillrate				Memory				API support	
Model	Core	Launch	Fab (nm)	Bus interface	Core clock (MHz)	Memory clock (MHz)	Core config^{1}	MOperations/s	MPixels/s	MTexels/s	MVertices/s	Size (MB)	Bandwidth (GB/s)	Bus type	Bus width (bit)	Direct3D	OpenGL
SiS 530/620	SiS 6306	1998		Ultra AGP	40	66-100	1:0:1:1	40	40	40	0	1-8	0.533-0.8	SDR	64	5.0	N/A
SiS 540	SiS 300	1999		Ultra AGP	?	66-133	1:0:1:1	?	?	?	0	4-64	0.533-1.066	SDR	64	6.0	1.1
SiS 630	SiS 305	2000		Ultra AGP	125	66-133 (System) ??? (EGM)	1:0:1:1	125	125	125	0	4-64	0.533-1.066 (System) ??? (EGM)	SDR	64 (System) 128 (EGM)	6.0	1.1
SiS 730	SiS 305	2000		Ultra AGP	125	100-133 (System) ??? (EGM)	1:0:1:1	125	125	125	0	4-64	0.8-1.066 (System) ??? (EGM)	SDR	64 (System) 128 (EGM)	6.0	1.1
Real256	SiS 315	2001		Ultra AGP	166	100-133 266–333	2:0:4:2	333	333	667	0	32-64	0.8-1.066 (SDR) 2.1-2.656 (DDR)	SDR DDR	64	7.0 (no T&L)	1.3
Mirage (Real256E)	SiS 315	2003		Ultra AGP	200	266-400	2:0:4:2	400	400	800	0	32-64	2.1-3.2	DDR	64	7.0 (no T&L)	1.3
Mirage 1	SiS 330	2004		Ultra AGP	200	266-400	2:0:4:2	400	400	800	0	32-64	2.1-6.4 (DDR) 3.2-12.8 (DDR2)	DDR DDR2	64 128 (AMD K8 only)	7.0 (no T&L)	1.3
Mirage 2		2004		Ultra AGP	200	266-400 400–800	4:0:8:4	800	800	1600	0	32-256	2.1-6.4 (DDR) 3.2-12.8 (DDR2)	DDR DDR2	64 128	8.1	1.4
Mirage 3	SiS 351	2006		Integrated	250	400-667	2:0:4:2	500	500	1000	0	32-256	3.2-5.3 (Intel) 3.2-12.8 (AMD)	DDR2	64 128 (AMD K8 only)	9.0	1.5
Mirage 3+		2007		Integrated	300	400-667	2:0:4:2	600	600	1200	0	32-256	3.2-5.3	DDR2	64	9.0	1.5
Mirage 4		Never released		Integrated	?	400-1066	?	?	?	?	?	?-256	3.2-17.0	DDR2	64 128	10.0 (PS 4.0/VS 3.0)	2.0

- ^{1}Pixel shaders: vertex shaders: texture mapping units: render output units

Some cards contain a 3D graphics accelerator but it is only functional with the SiS's Proprietary Windows-only driver (the company does not provide documentation for others to write drivers). However, the Linux kernel includes a working third party driver that, while not supporting 3D gaming, makes the cards usable under Linux.

== Touch-Screen chipsets ==
- SiS 9202
- SiS 9203
- SiS 9220P
- SiS 9223
- SiS 9250
- SiS 9250H
- SiS 9251
- SiS 9252
- SiS 9255
- SiS 9272
- SiS 9275
- SiS 9277

== See also ==
- List of companies of Taiwan
