= WDMA =

WDMA may refer to:

- WDMA (computer), transfer mode between a harddisk and computer
- Wavelength-division multiple access, used in optical communication links
- WDMA-CD, a television station (channel 16, virtual channel 31) licensed to Macon, Georgia, United States
