= SiS 630/730 =

Family of integrated chipsets from Intel and AMD

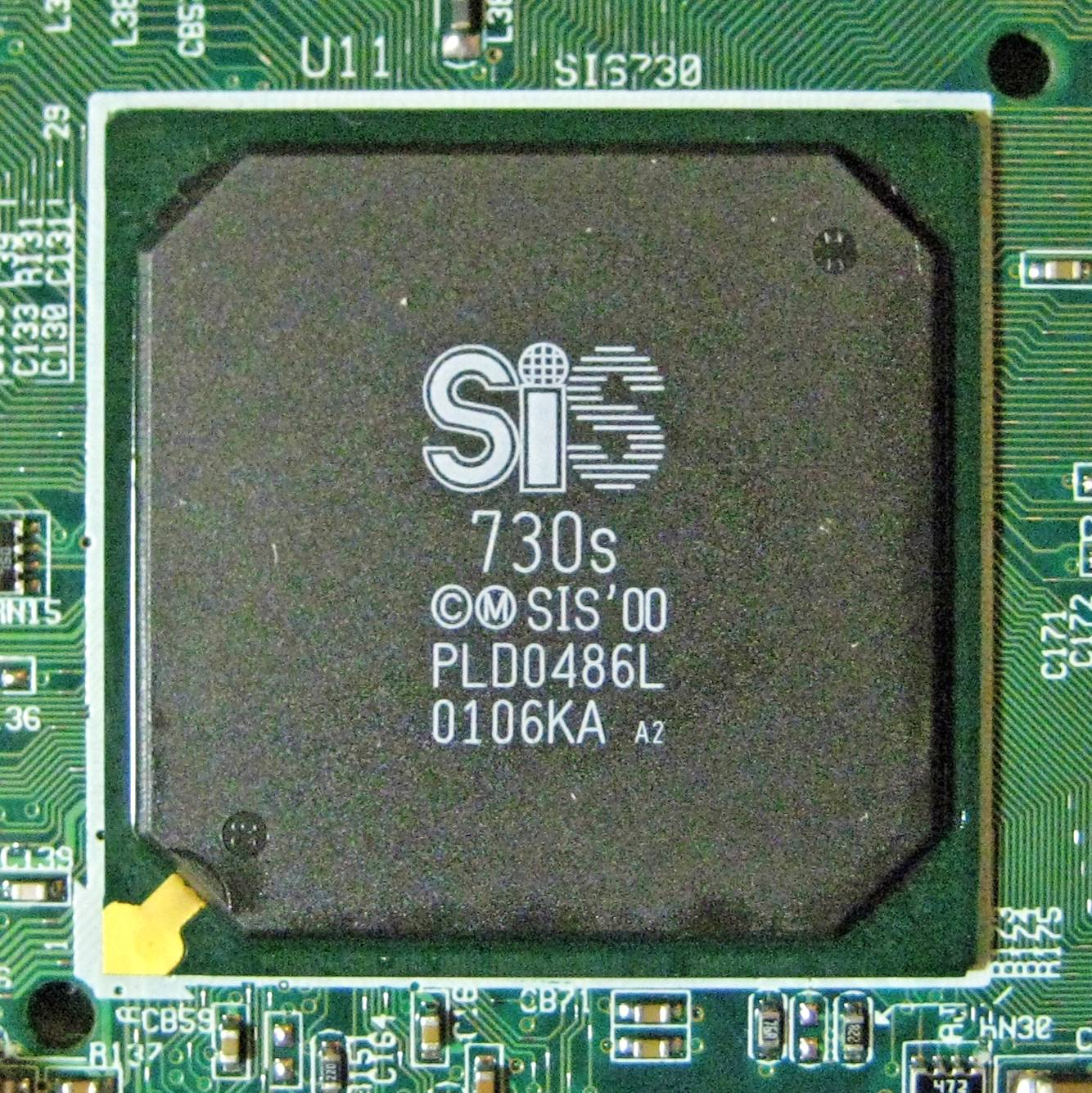
SiS 730S

The SiS 630 and SiS 730 are a family of highly integrated chipsets for Intel (Slot 1/Socket 370) and AMD (Slot A/Socket A) respectively. At the time of release they were unique in that they not only provided VGA, Audio, LAN, IDE and USB functionality on board, but were also in a single-chip solution. At the time of release (1999) most chipsets were composed of physically separate north-bridge and south-bridge chips (technically these still existed in the SiS 630/730 but were contained in a single package). Only later have single-chip solutions become popular in the mainstream, with chipsets such as the nVidia nForce4.

VGA Core (SiS 305)

- Hardware Acceleration (Motion Compensation and iDCT) for DVD Playback.
- Ultra-AGP Architecture.
- Fully DirectX 7.0 Compliant Graphics Engine.
- Resolution Up to 1920x1200 8bpp/16bpp 60 Hz NI.
- Optional Extended Graphics Memory (EGM) On board for 128-bit Memory Accessing.
- Supports VESA DDC1, DDC2B & DDC 3.0.
- Driver Support for OS/2(R), Windows(R) 95/98/ME, Windows NT(R) 4.0, Windows(R) 2000/XP.
- Supports SiS 301 Video Bridge Interface for Dual Display.
- NTSC/PAL TV or Secondary CRT monitor or TFT Digital LCD Monitor.

The video core in the SiS 630/730 is based on the 128-bit SiS 305. The VGA core is capable of using either its own dedicated local memory (giving a 128-bit memory interface) or taking a chunk out of system memory (usually configurable from between 8 MB to 64 MB, giving 64-bit memory interface). In the majority of systems it is configured to use system memory since to get local memory support it was necessary to use a special card which fitted into the proprietary VB slot which is impossible in laptops, and for desktop systems didn't make any sense once cheap AGP graphics cards became available offering superior performance. The onboard adapter competed well against the Intel i810 on Intel platforms and the VIA Twister on AMD both in terms of features and performance.

Unlike the Intel i810, the SiS 630 renders 3D in 32-bit colour (although the performance was quite poor). There was also support for full hardware decoding of MPEG2 which gave CPU usage of around 5-10% when watching DVDs with suitable software (Cyberlink PowerDVD 5 or VideoLAN Media Player). Access to the acceleration is provided via DXVA under Windows 2000/XP.

Another interesting feature is that the SiS 30x core supports two independent overlay surfaces, one for each output. This means that it is possible to view videos on both the primary monitor (e.g. the built in screen on a notebook) and on a TV-Out or secondary monitor output. Most other graphics cards only have one overlay surface or in some cases will clone the same overlay.

The memory bandwidth is shared between the graphics adapter and the rest of the system. Therefore, the system performance is dependent on the resolution and colour depth that is in use. Whilst this would give comparatively poor scores in pure memory throughput benchmarks (a SiS 630 system will show around 470 MB/s of memory read throughput compared to around 800 MB/s on a similar system with discrete graphics) the real-world performance in office applications was very good with systems (particularly budget notebooks) based around the chipset frequently walking away with "best buy" awards.

Audio (SiS 7018)

- 64-voice Polyphony 'Wavetable' sample-based Synthesizer.
- DirectSound 3D Accelerator for IID, IAD and Doppler Effects.
- Full-duplex, Independent Sample Rate Converter for Audio Recording and Playback.
- Supports 2/4/6 Speakers Output with Optional VirtualFX, VirtualAC3.
- AC'97 V2.1 Interface for External Audio Codec.
- SoundBlaster Pro/16 Compliant.
- Full Duplex VirtualPhone Speaker Phone with Modem Capable AC'97.
- V.90 Software Modem Compliant.
- Driver Support for Windows 95/98/ME, NT 4.0, Windows 2000/XP.

Unlike the later SiS 735 chipset which used the host-processed SiS 7012, the SiS 630/730 featured the fully hardware accelerated SiS 7018 core which itself is a design licensed from Trident, sold as the Trident 4DWave (the same design was also licensed by ALi for use in their 5451 chipset). The Windows 95 VxD drivers take advantage of the hardware acceleration, and there is also SoundBlaster 16 emulation for MS-DOS based games.

Unfortunately SiS chose to drop all of the hardware features from Windows 2000 onwards, treating it as a simpler AC97 host processed solution, as the SiS 7012. At the time of writing there is still no support for the hardware DirectSound, mixing or MIDI features that this chip provides in the WDM driver.

10/100 Fast Ethernet (SiS 900)

- IEEE802.3/IEEE802.3u Compatible, 10BASE-T/100BASE-TX Standards Support.
- Supports On-Now, Wake-On-LAN, PCI Power Management 1.1.
- Driver Support for Windows 95/98/ME, NT 4.0, Windows 2000/XP, OS/2, Netware, ODI, SCO Unix, Netware & Linux.

Onboard Ethernet functionality is provided by an SiS 900 compatible controller providing both 10 Mbit/s and 100 Mbit/s with auto-sensing.

USB (SiS 7001)
The SiS 630/730 provides two USB 1.1 controllers called the SiS 7001, theoretically allowing 2 12 Mbit/s shared amongst up to 6 physical USB ports. On some boards or notebook systems only one of the controllers is used, with the other one going unused.

IDE (SiS 5513)
The IDE controller on the SiS 630/730 provides support for up to UDMA/100 depending on the specific variant. The IDE controller connects to the "north-bridge" via a dedicated 133 MB/s link, separate from the second 133 MB/s link between the north bridge and other PCI devices. This is beneficial in two ways; firstly IDE performance shouldn't be affected by other PCI devices, and similarly IDE transfers shouldn't affect other devices such as sound cards.

Other Hardware Features
In addition to the features listed above, the SiS 630/730 has support for legacy ports including SPP/ECP/EPP parallel port, 2 serial ports and Fast Infrared/IrDA. There is also a modem interface for HSP AMR modems such as those from SmartLink and PCTel.

Comparison of Models
Host
| | SiS 630 | SiS 630E | SiS 630ET | SiS 630S | SiS 630ST | SiS 730S |
|---|---|---|---|---|---|---|
| Host Processor | Intel Celeron / Pentium III (FCPGA) | Intel Celeron / Pentium III (FCPGA) | Intel Celeron / Pentium III (FCPGA/FCPGA2) | Intel Celeron / Pentium III (FCPGA) | Intel Celeron / Pentium III (FCPGA/FCPGA2) | AMD Athlon/Duron (Slot A/Socket A) |
| Bus Voltage | AGTL+ | AGTL+ | AGTL+ | AGTL+ | AGTL+ | |
| Number Processors | 1 | | | | | |
| FSB | 66/100/133 MHz | | | | | 100/133 MHz |
DRAM
| | SiS 630 | SiS 630E | SiS 630ET | SiS 630S | SiS 630ST | SiS 730S |
| Memory Support | 3-DIMM/6-bank or 2-DIMM | | | | | |
| Mbit Support | 16 / 64 / 128 / 256 / 512 MB per Row | | | | | |
| Max Memory Size | 1.5 GB (3-DIMM) / 1.0 GB (2-DIMM) | | | | | |
| Memory Type | PC100/PC133 SDRAM/VCM | | PC100/PC133 SDRAM | | | |
| Memory Bus | 66/100/133 MHz | | | | | |
| FSB/Memory Bus Mode | Synchronous / Asynchronous | | | | | |
| ECC Support | N/A | | | | | |
PCI Interface
| | SiS 630 | SiS 630E | SiS 630ET | SiS 630S | SiS 630ST | SiS 730S |
| PCI Spec. | Compliant to PCI 2.2 | | | | | |
| Max PCI Masters | 4 | | | | | |
AGP Interface
| | SiS 630 | SiS 630E | SiS 630ET | SiS 630S | SiS 630ST | SiS 730S |
| Integrated Graphics | Yes | | | | | |
| AGP Compliancy | Compliant to AGP 2.0 | | | | | |
| Co-operate with SiS Video Bridge | Yes | N/A | N/A | Yes | Yes | Yes |
| Video Memory | SMA/Extension Video Memory | SMA | SMA | SMA | SMA | SMA/Extension Video Memory |
| SMA | 8/16/32/64 MB | | | | | |
| External AGP Slot | N/A | | | Yes | | |
| AGP Spec. | Ultra AGP | | | | | |
I/O
| | SiS 630 | SiS 630E | SiS 630ET | SiS 630S | SiS 630ST | SiS 730S |
| USB | 2 Controllers: 5 Ports | 2 Controllers: 5 Ports | 2 Controllers: 5 Ports | 2 Controllers: 6 Ports | 2 Controllers: 6 Ports | 2 Controllers: 6 Ports |
| IDE | ATA/33/66 | | ATA/33/66/100 | | | |
Ethernet
| | SiS 630 | SiS 630E | SiS 630ET | SiS 630S | SiS 630ST | SiS 730S |
| Ethernet | Integrated 10/100 Mb Fast Ethernet Controller and PHY | | | Integrated 10/100 Mb Fast Ethernet Controller | | |
AC'97
| | SiS 630 | SiS 630E | SiS 630ET | SiS 630S | SiS 630ST | SiS 730S |
| Hardware Audio | Yes (Microphone/Line level/Computer speaker/SPDIF) | | | | | |
| HSP V.90 Modem | Yes | | | | | |
Appendix
| | SiS 630 | SiS 630E | SiS 630ET | SiS 630S | SiS 630ST | SiS 730S |
| Hardware DVD | Yes | | | | | |
| 3D Stereo Glasses | Yes | | | | | |

== See also ==
- Silicon Integrated Systems
