= SiS 300 =

Graphics Processing Unit

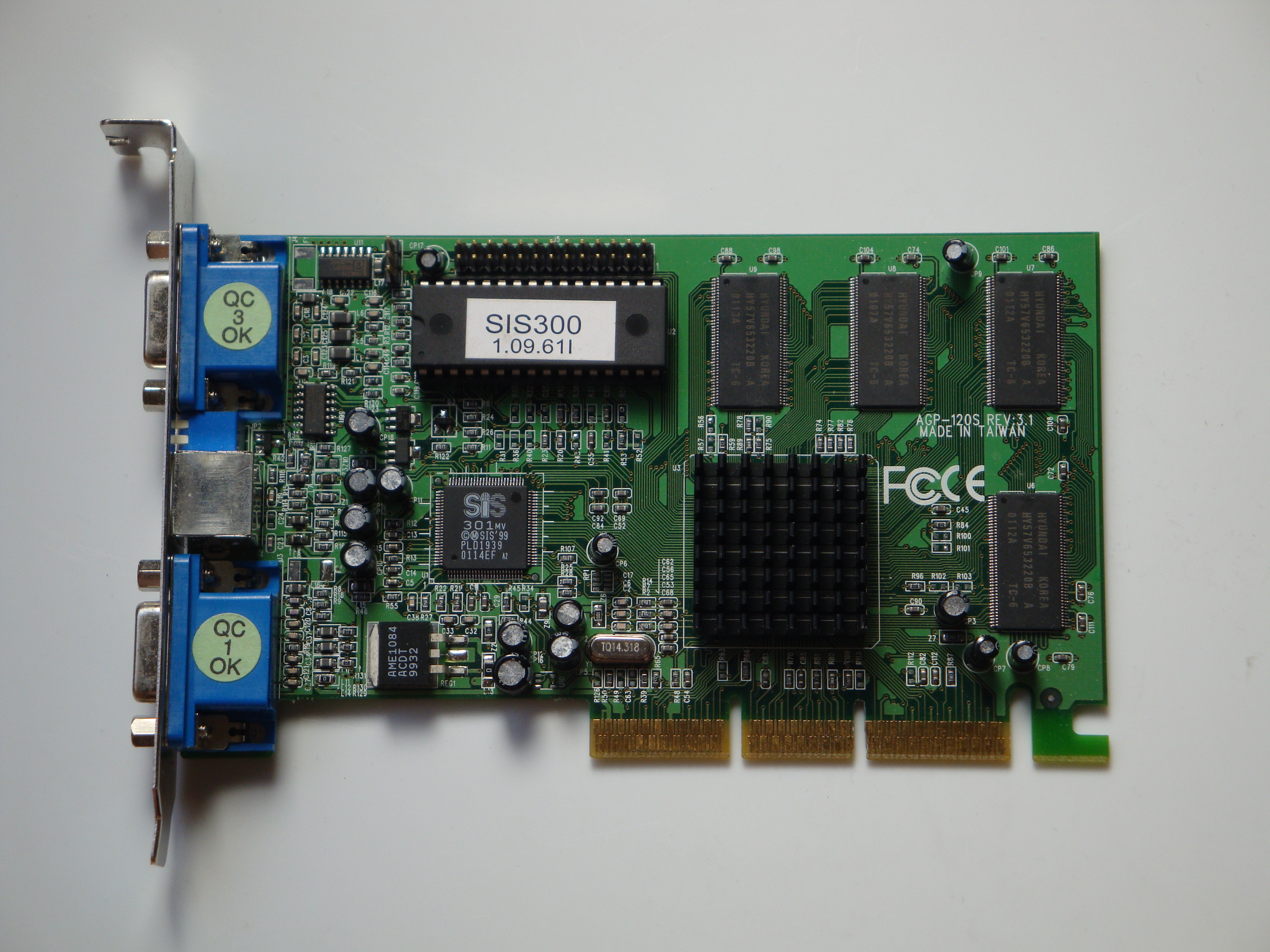
- A SiS 300 AGP graphics card with support for dual monitors
- Release date: 1999; 26 years ago

The SiS 300 is a graphics processing unit that was manufactured by Silicon Integrated Systems. This GPU targeted mainstream commercial and consumer markets.

== Overview ==
Following the successful SiS 6326 in 1998, SiS introduced the SiS 300 as its replacement. The 3D performance was improved five times over the previous GPU, although still considered slow, yet a value solution as a display chip for users that don't use 3D-intensive applications.

The SiS 301 was a companion chip that enabled support for TVs and digital flat panel monitors.

== Architecture ==
This chip featured a 128-bit memory bus that could access 4/8/16/32/64 MB of RAM, DirectX 6.0 support with multi-textures capability, DVD decoder and an AGP 2x/4x bus to the system.

The SiS 300 was manufactured in a 250 nm process and packaged in a 365 pin PBGA. The SiS 301 was packaged in a 100 pin TQFP.
