= UDMA =

Data transfer method for ATA hard drives

The Ultra DMA (Ultra Direct Memory Access, UDMA) modes are the fastest methods used to transfer data through the ATA hard disk interface, usually between a computer and an ATA device. UDMA succeeded Single/Multiword DMA as the interface of choice between ATA devices and the computer. There are eight different UDMA modes, ranging from 0 to 6 for ATA (0 to 7 for CompactFlash), each with its own timing.

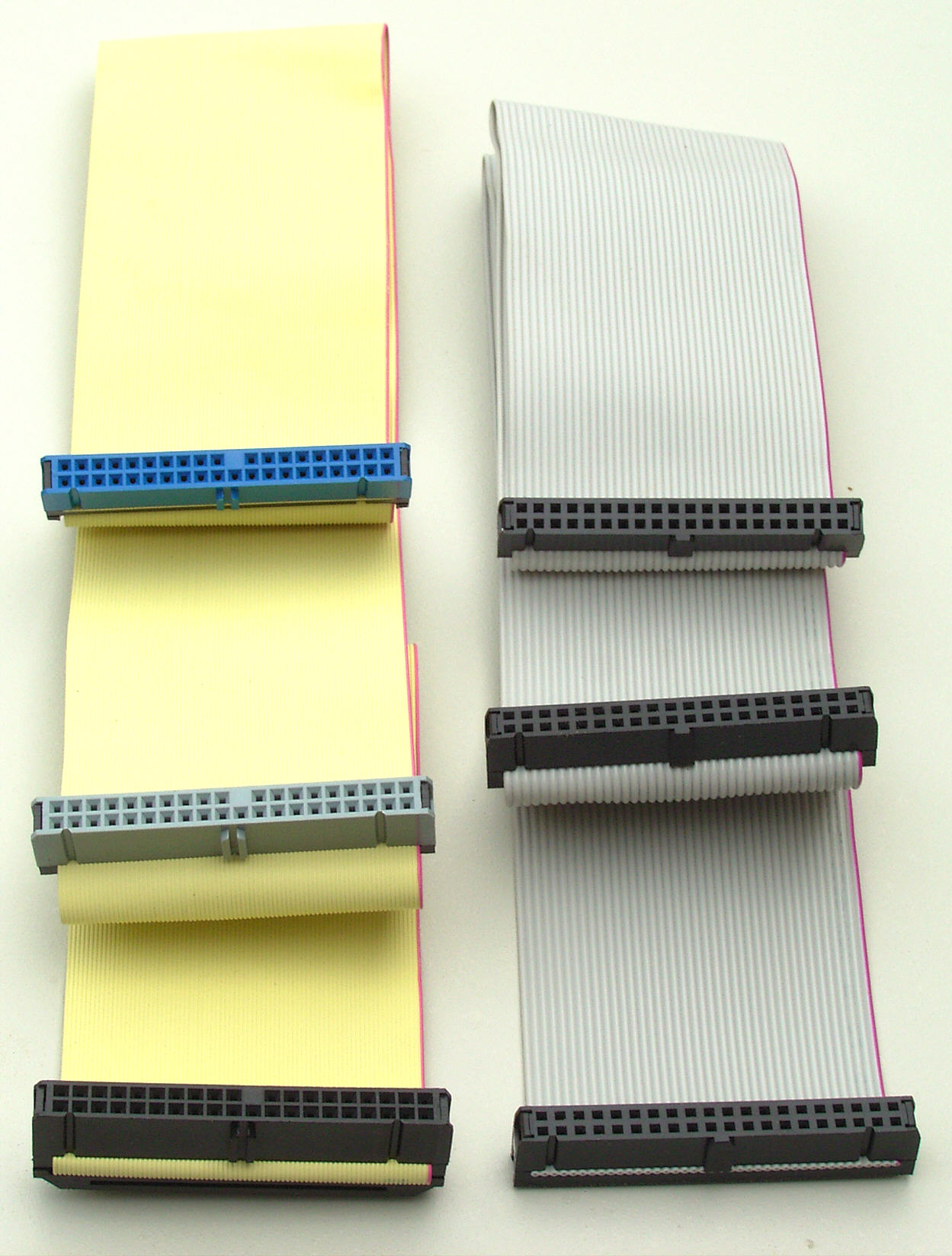
80-conductor cable used for modes faster than UDMA 2 on the left compared to a 40-conductor cable

Modes faster than UDMA mode 2 require an 80-conductor cable to reduce data settling times, lower impedance and reduce crosstalk.

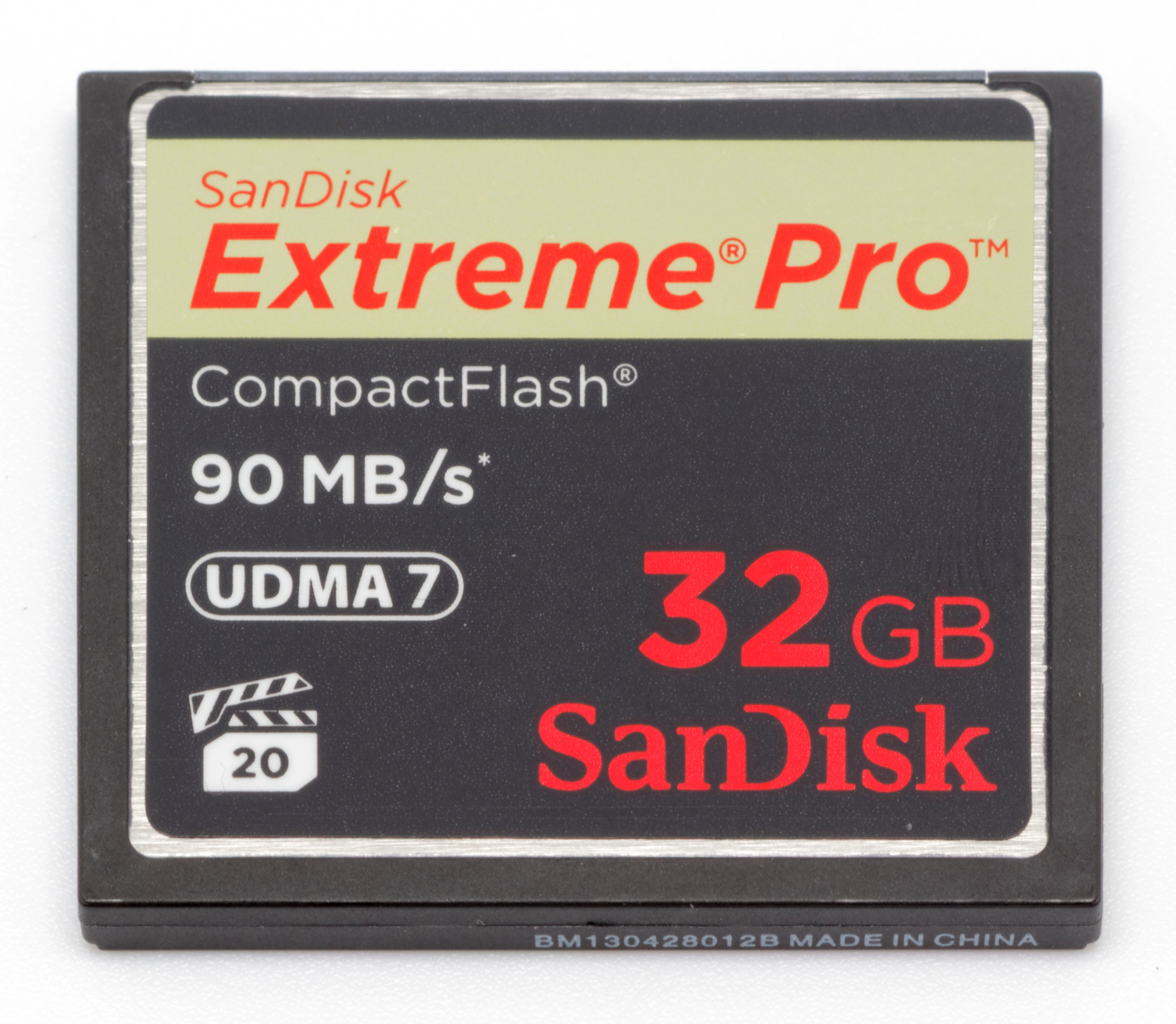
SanDisk 32 GB CF card supporting VPG20 and UDMA7

Transfer modes
Mode	Number	Also called	Maximum transfer rate (MB/s)	Minimum cycle time	Defining standard
Ultra DMA	0		16.7	120 ns	ATA-4
Ultra DMA	1		25.0	80 ns	ATA-4
Ultra DMA	2	Ultra ATA/33	33.3	60 ns	ATA-4
Ultra DMA	3		44.4	45 ns	ATA-5
Ultra DMA	4	Ultra ATA/66	66.7	30 ns	ATA-5
Ultra DMA	5	Ultra ATA/100	100	20 ns	ATA-6
Ultra DMA	6	Ultra ATA/133	133	15 ns	ATA-7
Ultra DMA	7	Ultra ATA/167	167	12 ns	CompactFlash 6.0

== See also ==
- PIO—The first interface type used between devices (mainly hard disks) and the computer.
- Parallel ATA
- Serial ATA
