= SiS 6326 =

1997 GPU by Silicon Integrated Systems

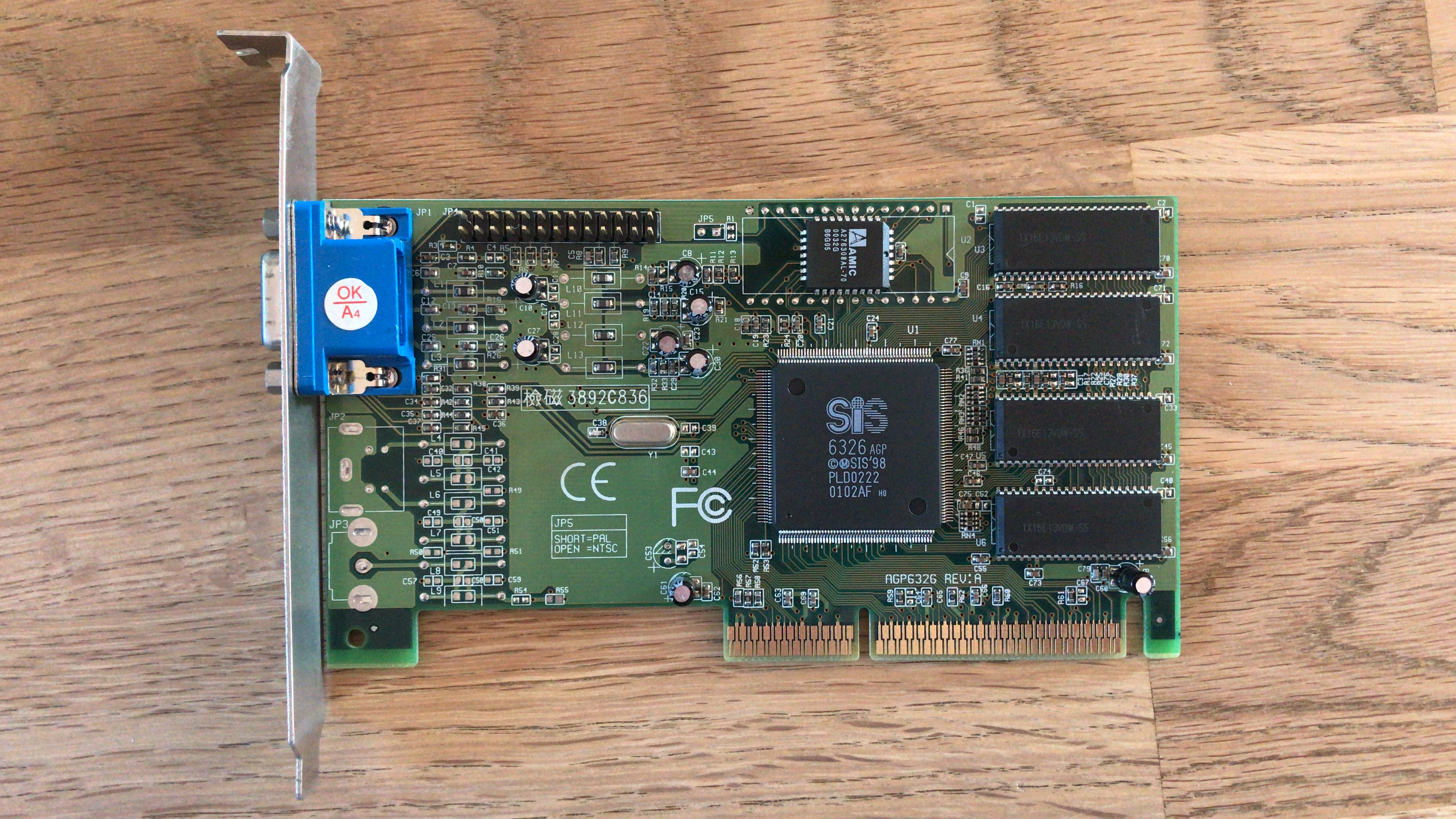
- A SiS 6326 AGP graphics card
- Release date: June 1997; 29 years ago

The SiS 6326 was a graphics processing unit (GPU) manufactured by Silicon Integrated Systems. It was introduced in June 1997 and became available to the consumer market in the end of that year. Although its performance was low compared to the GPUs of its age, eventually it became very successful, specially integrated in many motherboards designed to the corporate market, where the low cost is prioritized over 3D performance. SiS shipped over seven million units of the SiS 6326 in 1998.

== Architecture ==
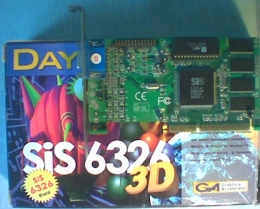

The SiS was available as a discrete card, with an AGP 2x or PCI bus, and as an integrated GPU. It had a 64-bit 2D/3D graphics accelerator [with most cards running at 75 MHz and later revisions running at 90 MHz], a DVD decoder and a TV decoder. It was available with 4 MB or 8 MB of memory.

== Performance ==
Since the model aimed for low cost over high performance, its capabilities were low compared to contemporary products. According to a test conducted by Tom's Hardware on January 21, 1998, it possessed roughly a third of the performance of an NVidia RIVA 128 or 40% less than an ATI Rage Pro in terms of frames per second in Direct3D benchmarks, and simply could not play Quake 2 due to its lack of OpenGL support. Yet the same article says that even the "slow and unknown graphic chip" could still produce "quite nice image quality".

A beta driver made by AOpen was released as late as 1999, being the only version with an OpenGL ICD included, which finally allowed it to run some OpenGL games such as GLQuake, Quake 2, and Quake 3, as well as tech demos such as GLexcess. Despite technically being playable, the performance in those games are not very good.

The SiS 6326 was even capable of running relatively newer 3D applications such as 3DMark2001 SE with no significant image flaws to be found despite its abysmal speed.

== Linux support ==
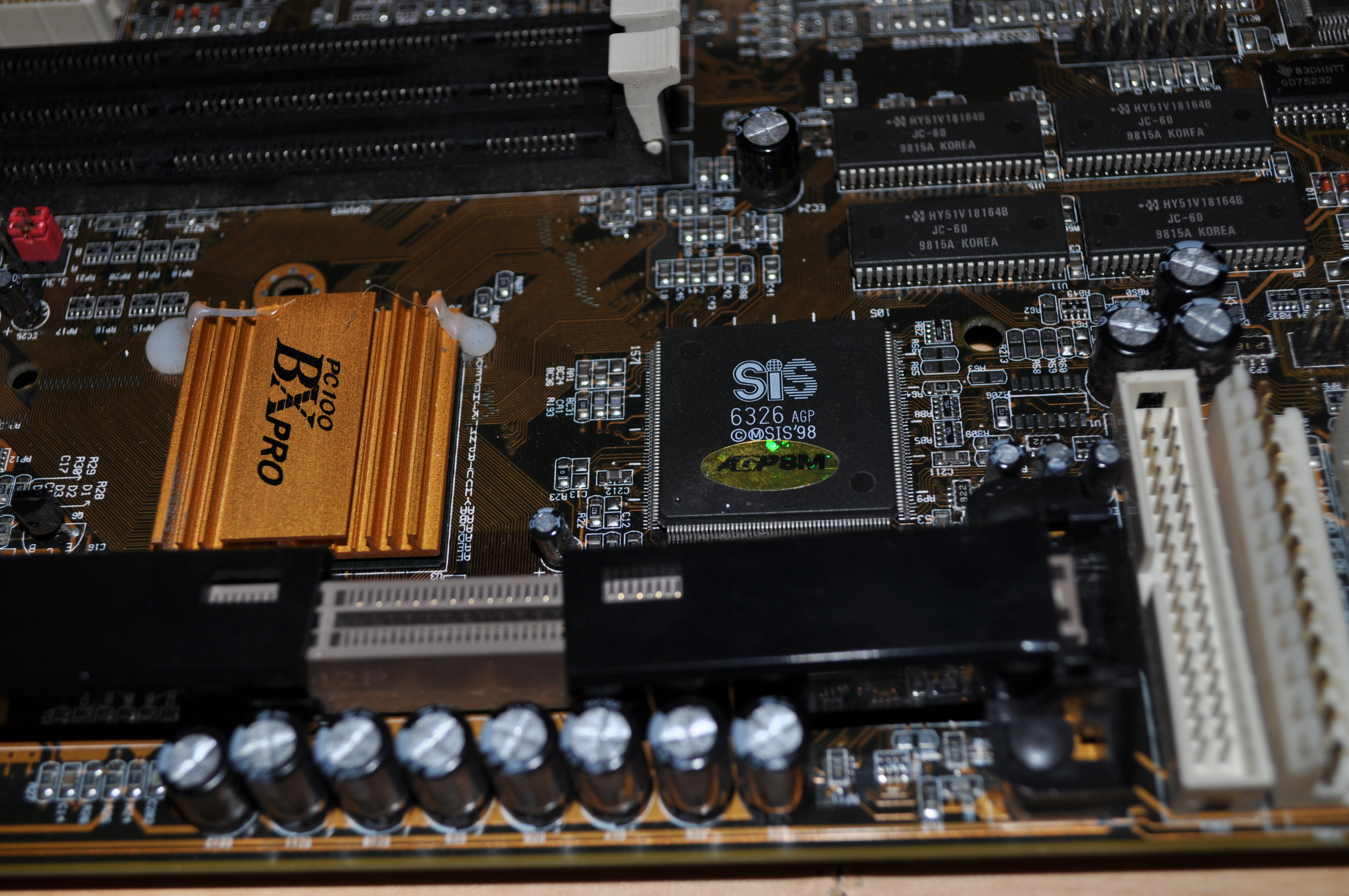
SiS 6326AGP graphics chip integrated into a Slot 1 motherboard. The 4 chips above contain the 8 MB of video memory.

There is little support for Linux aside from the drivers developed independently by Thomas Winischhofer. Since the driver does not support OpenGL, not even the Windows one provided by SiS, it only allows for 2D acceleration. There is also an experimental FrameBuffer driver developed by Sergio Costas, currently unsupported, available only for 2.4 kernels and without any kind of hardware acceleration. This driver was not ported to 2.6 because the native VesaFB driver available offered the same capabilities.

== Variants and immediate successors ==
In 1998, DVD/Macro-Vision and then AGP variants of the SiS 6326 were released. Later that year, northbridge chipsets with integrated GPUs were released: SiS 530 for Socket 7, and SiS 620 for socket 370, both based in a cut down version of the SiS 6326, named SiS 6306 operating at 40 MHz. It was in April 1999 that the SiS 6326 was made officially obsolete by the SiS 300.
