= Programmed input–output =

Method of CPU communication with peripheral devices

Programmed input–output (also programmed input/output, programmed I/O, PIO) is a method of data transmission, via input/output (I/O), between a central processing unit (CPU) and a peripheral device, such as a Parallel ATA storage device. Each data item transfer is initiated by an instruction in the program, involving the CPU for every transaction. In contrast, in direct memory access (DMA) operations, the CPU is uninvolved in the data transfer.

The term can refer to either memory-mapped I/O (MMIO) or port-mapped I/O (PMIO). PMIO refers to transfers using a special address space outside of normal memory, usually accessed with dedicated instructions, such as IN and OUT in x86 architectures. MMIO refers to transfers to I/O devices that are mapped into the normal address space available to the program. PMIO was very useful for early microprocessors with small address spaces, since the valuable resource was not consumed by the I/O devices.

The best known example of a PC device that uses programmed I/O is the Parallel AT Attachment (PATA) interface; however, the AT Attachment interface can also be operated in any of several DMA modes. Many older devices in a PC also use PIO, including legacy serial ports, legacy parallel ports when not in ECP mode, keyboard and mouse PS/2 ports, legacy MIDI and joystick ports, the interval timer, and older network interfaces.

== PIO mode in the ATA interface ==
The PIO interface is grouped into different modes that correspond to different transfer rates. The electrical signaling among the different modes is similar — only the cycle time between transactions is reduced in order to achieve a higher transfer rate. All ATA devices support the slowest mode — Mode 0. By accessing the information registers (using Mode 0) on an ATA drive, the CPU is able to determine the maximum transfer rate for the device and configure the ATA controller for optimal performance.

The PIO modes require a great deal of CPU overhead to configure a data transaction and transfer the data. Because of this inefficiency, the DMA (and eventually Ultra Direct Memory Access (UDMA) interface was created to increase performance. The simple digital logic needed to implement a PIO transfer still makes this transfer method useful today, especially if high transfer rates are unneeded as in embedded systems, or with field-programmable gate array (FPGA) chips, where PIO mode can be used with no significant performance loss.

Two additional advanced timing modes have been defined in the CompactFlash specification 2.0. Those are PIO modes 5 and 6. They are specific to CompactFlash.

PIO modes
Mode	Maximum transfer rate (MB/s)	Minimum cycle time	Standard where spec is defined
Mode 0	3.3	600 ns	ATA-1
Mode 1	5.2	383 ns	ATA-1
Mode 2	8.3	240 ns	ATA-1
Mode 3	11.1	180 ns	ATA-2
Mode 4	16.7	120 ns	ATA-2
Mode 5	20	100 ns	CompactFlash 2.0
Mode 6	25	80 ns	CompactFlash 2.0

=== PIO Mode 5 ===
A PIO Mode 5 was proposed with operation at 22 MB/s, but was never implemented on hard disks because CPUs of the time would have been severely slowed waiting for the hard disk at the proposed PIO 5 timings, and the DMA standard ultimately obviated it. While no hard disk drive was ever manufactured to support this mode, some motherboard manufacturers preemptively provided BIOS support for it. PIO Mode 5 can be used with CompactFlash cards connected to ATA via CF-to-ATA adapters.

== See also ==
- WDMA (computer) – single/multi-word DMA
- AT Attachment – ATA specification
- Input/output
- Interrupt
- List of device bandwidths
- CompactFlash
