= WDMA (computer) =

The Word DMA (WDMA) interface is a method for transferring data between a computer (through an Advanced Technology Attachment (ATA) controller) and an ATA device; it was the fastest method until Ultra Direct Memory Access (UDMA) was implemented. Single/Multiword DMA took over from programmed input/output (PIO) as the choice of interface between ATA devices and the computer. The WDMA interface is grouped into different modes.

In single transfer mode, only one word (16-bit) will be transferred between the device and the computer before returning control to the CPU, and later it will repeat this cycle even if the DMA request line is continuously asserted, allowing the CPU to process data while data is transferred. This kind of transfer is implemented as "single mode transfer" in the Intel 8237 DMA controller. In multiword transfer mode, once a transfer has begun it will continue until all words are transferred or the drive negates the DMA request line. This mode is implemented as "demand mode transfer" in the Intel 8237 DMA controller.

Two additional Advanced Timing modes have been defined in the CompactFlash specification 2.1. Those are Multiword DMA mode 3 and Multiword DMA mode 4. They are specific to CompactFlash. Multiword DMA is only permitted for CompactFlash devices configured in True IDE mode.

DMA modes
Mode	Max. transfer rate (MB/s)	Bits	Min. cycle time (ns)	Defining standard
Single 0	2.1	16	960	ATA-1
Single 1	4.2	16	480	ATA-1
Single 2	8.3	16	240	ATA-1
Multi 0	4.2	16	480	ATA-1
Multi 1	13.3	16	150	ATA-2
Multi 2	16.7	16	120	ATA-2
Multi 3	20	16	100	CompactFlash 2.1
Multi 4	25	16	80	CompactFlash 2.1
