= Alaris, Inc. =

Defunct American computer company

- Type: Private
- Industry: Computer
- Founded: 1991; 35 years ago in Fremont, California, United States
- Founders: Raymond Yu; Philip Lau
- Defunct: 2002; 24 years ago
- Fate: Acquired
- Number of employees: 30 (1997)

Alaris, Inc., was an American computer hardware and software vendor active from 1991 to 2002. During the first half of its existence, the company sold high-performance x86- and PowerPC-based motherboards (manufactured by IBM) as either aftermarket upgrades for consumers or for OEMs to put in their own computer systems. Alaris also briefly sold its own computer systems. In 1996, the company pivoted to software, releasing the Videogram suite of video compression software intended for low-bandwidth websites and email. In 2002, the company was acquired in whole by a Japanese electronics conglomerate. (Note: The name of the Japanese company which acquired Alaris is not disclosed in the press release cited.)

== History ==
=== Hardware products (1991–1996) ===
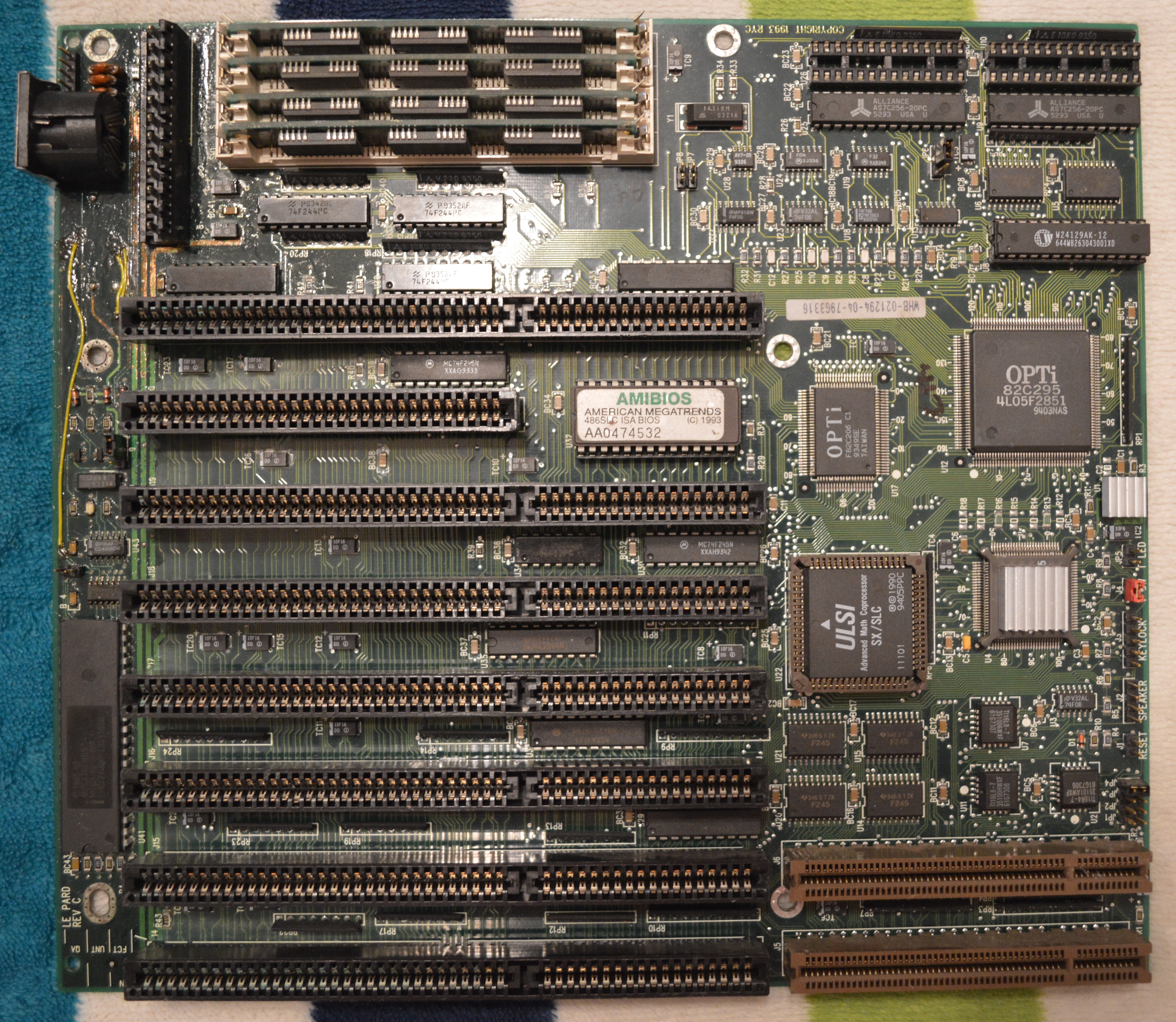
An original Leopard board by Alaris, built in early 1994

Alaris, Inc., was founded by Raymond Yu and Philip Lau in Fremont, California, in 1991, as a producer of high-performance motherboards for personal computers. Both Yu and Lau had worked as executives for Everex Systems (Yu as VP of engineering and Lau as treasurer) in the 1980s. Everex was another Fremont-based computer hardware manufacturer, which found market success in the early 1980s as a vendor of IBM PC–compatible computer systems and expansion cards before faltering in the early 1990s, culminating in its Chapter 11 bankruptcy in 1993. The two operated Alaris in stealth mode for the first two years of its existence before announcing its first products in 1993. Yu and Lau positioned the company as a design and manufacturing firm to support systems integrators who wanted to avoid investing in hardware development capabilities themselves. Their initial business model focused on providing clients with early access to cutting-edge technologies through partnerships designed for very high volume manufacturing and global distribution. This strategy came at a time when the PC industry in the early 1990s had been shifting away from prioritizing hardware, which had mostly become a commodity, in favor of software and services.

Alaris announced its first products, comprising a line of IBM PC compatibles, in March 1993. Later in the same month, Alaris signed a contract with IBM for the latter to produce PC-compatible motherboards based on Alaris's specifications from IBM's Microelectronics plants in Burlington, Vermont, and Charlotte, North Carolina. Alaris's motherboards initially made exclusive use of IBM's 486SLC line of processors, a licensed clone of Intel's i486SX which IBM introduced in 1992. Alaris paid IBM US$127 million for the contract, representing a total shipment of several hundred thousands of motherboards. Yu had previously considered Solectron and SCI Systems as manufacturers of their motherboards but ultimately turned to IBM for their more rigorous testing services and three-year warranty program. By 1994, Alaris was one of IBM's largest customers, as well as one of the most popular vendors of IBM's x86-based processors. Said Yu the previous year: "I don't consider [IBM] a contractor. I consider them a partner".

Alaris' first motherboard, the Leopard, was announced in July 1993 and began shipping later in the year. The motherboard was equipped with the 486SLC2 clocked at 66 MHz, featured eight ISA slots (two with VLB extensions), and was upgradable to 16 MB of RAM. In August 1993, Alaris announced the fully 32-bit Cougar motherboard, which came equipped with IBM's "Blue Lightning" 486BL processor clocked at 75 MHz (25 MHz internal bus) onto a socket supporting an optional aftermarket Pentium OverDrive, seven ISA expansion slots (two with VLB expansions, one of which is preoccupied with a VLB disk controller card), and an i387SX math coprocessor. The Cougar was incorporated onto Alaris' first computer system, the Alaris Cougar EnergySmart PC BL3X/75, released in the summer of 1994. The computer system received generally positive reviews in InfoWorld and PC Magazine, with writer Tom Albano of the latter publication considering it superior to IBM's own Ambra Lightning 100 system, despite the latter's processor being clocked faster at 100 MHz.

In April 1994, Alaris introduced the successor to the original Leopard, the Leopard Plus, which shipped with the same 486SLC2 processor clocked at 66 MHz but put it on a Pentium OverDrive socket like the Cougar and added an additional VLB slot, a flash-upgradable BIOS ROM, a COAST slot for extra processor cache, and optimized support for the company's EnergySmart power conservation software.

In June 1994, Alaris became one of the first computer systems manufacturers outside the Apple–IBM–Motorola alliance to announce a desktop computer system based on the PowerPC platform. The company slated their PowerPC offerings for a late 1994 release, pending the delivery of the PowerPC version of IBM's OS/2 (later released as Workplace OS in 1995), as well as Microsoft's Windows NT 3.5 for PowerPC. In November 1994, Alaris introduced the Cian line of upgradable computers, which had the ability to change the computer bus between multiple standards through a riser card on the motherboard. One such option was to upgrade the bus from x86 and ISA to PowerPC and PCI.

In fall 1994, Alaris became the first company to ship a computer with NexGen's Nx586 processor, which was a competitor to Intel's Pentium processor manufactured at IBM Microelectronics in Burlington. Their partnership was announced in July 1994, with the first computers, based on the 60- and 66-MHz Nx586 processor, slated for a September 1994 release. In August 1994, Alaris upgraded the terms of their agreement with NexGen, with Alaris becoming NexGen's primary developer of motherboard specifications and other hardware products for OEMs. By late 1994, Alaris had released VLB computer systems with 90- and 100-MHz versions of the Nx586. In 1995, they delivered a 100-MHz Nx586 system. Alaris supplied NexGen-based motherboards to several other computer systems manufacturers during this time, including Aberdeen, Inc.; Blackship Computer Systems; Datastor; Duracom Computer Systems; Maximus Computer Systems; and Tangent Computer.

Alaris announced their first graphics card with the Stinger in November 1994. Released in the following January, the Stinger is a 64-bit PCI card based on S3's Vision864 GPU; with the stock 1 MB of VRAM, it supports up to 24-bit color at a 800-by-600-pixel resolution or 8-bit color at 1024-by-768-pixel resolution. With 2 MB of VRAM, the Stinger supports a maximum resolution of 1600 by 1200 pixels. Alaris followed up the Stinger with the Matinee, also PCI-based and which came with 2-MB of VRAM stock.

=== Videogram (1996–2002) ===
In 1996, Alaris began shifting away from motherboard and graphics card design in favor of developing software for compressing digital video into file sizes and bitrates appropriate for the computer hardware of the time. That year, the company hired Ilya Asnis, an immigrant of Saint Petersburg who developed a software package capable of transcoding video into very small file sizes, appropriate for sending via email as attachments. Alaris named the software Videogram and released it in March 1996. The Videogram suite comprised three products: the Videogram Player software, for playback; the Videogram Packager software, for transcoding; and the Quick Video Transport ISA TV tuner, for grabbing video from composite video sources. The original Packager software resampled the video down to a resolution of 320 by 240 pixels at 15 frames per second, capable of compressing a 5-MB video file down to 210 KB. Both the Videogram codec and the QuickVideo ISA card were developed in-house at Alaris; unlike most other video compression solutions at the time, Alaris' codec was not based on MPEG. In August 1996, Alaris developed a professional version of the Videogram software aimed at the industrial Web video streaming market.

Alaris briefly returned to the computer system market after announcing that they had signed on to produce a PowerPC motherboard based on Motorola's Yellowknife reference design in November 1996. However, their partnership with Motorola was limited to producing boards as OEM evaluation units and proved fleeting.

In February 1998, Alaris released the QuickVideo DVC I, a webcam and general-purpose video camera capable of recording video at a resolution of 508 by 492 pixels at 30 frames per second at 24-bit color. Alaris pre-packaged the DVC I with the Videogram Creator software (essentially the Player and Packager software rolled into one package).

In 2002, Alaris was acquired in whole by a Japanese electronics conglomerate.
