= Thampy Thomas =

A. Thampy Thomas (born 1945 or 1946) is an electrical engineer who contributed to microprocessor pipeline architecture and founded semiconductor company NexGen microsystems.

== Elxsi ==
In 1979, Thomas co-founded Elxsi, a semiconductor company in Silicon Valley. Thomas holds Ph.D. and M.S. in electrical engineering from Stanford University and B.E. in Electrical Engineering from Birla Institute of Technology and Science, Pilani.

Thomas was the Senior Vice President of Engineering at Elxsi from 1979 to 1985. Elxsi was the first computer company to use more than one processor. Elxsi investors included the Tata Group and Arthur Rock.

== NexGen ==
After Elxsi, Thomas founded NexGen Microsystems. Nexgen implemented the x86 architecture in its processors. Their processors translated code designed to run on the traditionally CISC-based x86 architecture to run on the chip's internal RISC architecture. After the announcement of a competitor to Intel's i386 line of CPUs, journalist John C. Dvorak described Thomas as "a big-time defender of CISC architecture". Much of the underlying theory was developed during Thomas' doctorate work, under the supervision of his advisor, Ed Davidson.

Thomas was president, CEO, and chairman at Nexgen. He was succeeded as CEO by Atiq Raza in 1991 but remained chairman. Nexgen went public in 1995, and AMD acquired Nexgen later that year.

== Other service ==
Thomas has served as the chairman and CEO of PostX (now owned by Cisco), Director at Micro Linear Corporation (acquired by Sirenza), Director of Liquid Robotics, board member at Jupiter Research Foundation, and Director at Vintners' Alliance.
