= Die shot =

Photo or recording of the layout of an integrated circuit

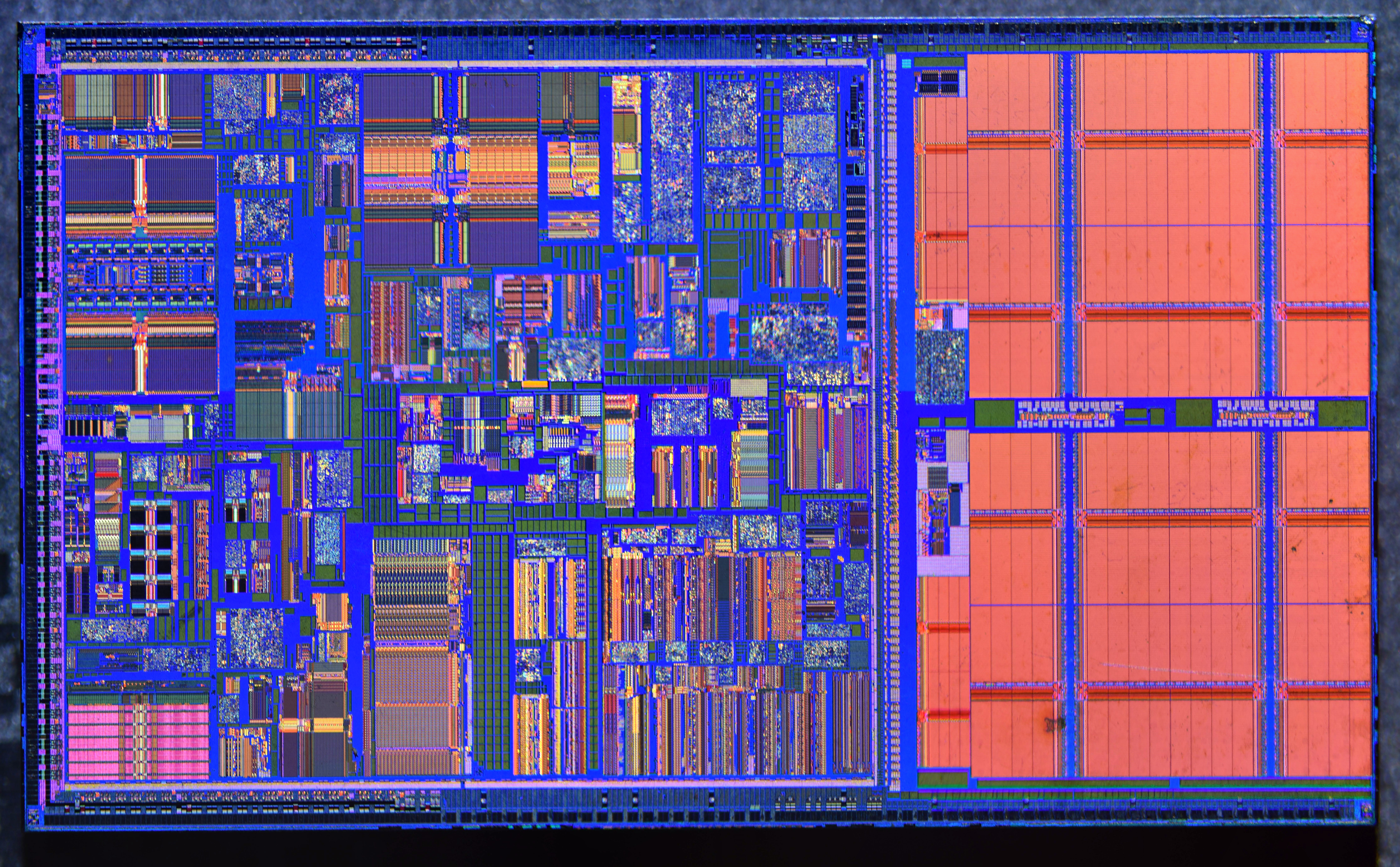
Die shot of an Intel Mobile Pentium II (Dixon)

A die shot or die photography is a photo or recording of the layout of an integrated circuit, showing its design with any packaging removed. A die shot can be compared with the cross-section of an (almost) two-dimensional computer chip, on which the design and construction of various tracks and components can be clearly seen. Due to the high complexity of modern computer chips, die-shots are often displayed colourfully, with various parts coloured by diffraction within the parts of the die, using special lighting or even manually.

== Methods ==
A die shot is a picture of a computer chip without its housing or packaging. There are two ways to capture such a chip "naked" on a photo; by either taking the photo before a chip is packaged or by removing its package.

=== Avoiding the package ===
Taking a photo before the chip ends up in a housing is typically preserved to the chip manufacturer, because the chip is packed fairly quickly in the production process to protect the sensitive very small parts against external influences. However, manufacturers may be reluctant to share die shots to prevent competitors from easily gaining insight into the technological progress and complexity of a chip.

=== Removing the package ===
Removing the housing from a chip is typically a chemical process called decapping - a chip is so small and the parts are so microscopic that opening a housing (also named delidding) with tools such as saws, sanders or dremels could damage the chip in such a way that a die shot is no longer or less useful. For example, sulfuric acid can be used to dissolve the plastic housing of a chip. Chips are immersed in a glass jar with sulfuric acid, after which the sulfuric acid is boiled for up to 45 minutes at a temperature of 337 degrees Celsius. Once the plastic housing has decayed, there may be other processes to remove leftover carbon, such as with a hot bath of concentrated nitric acid. After this, the contents of a chip are relatively exposed and a picture can be made of the chip with macrophotography or microphotography.

== Legal aspects ==
The circuit layout of integrated circuits is generally not subject to copyright, because it is functional in nature. Since die shots are usually much too low in resolution and picture many layers at once, it is impossible to reproduce the pictured circuits using a die shot. Therefore die shots are not restricted under laws like the Semiconductor Chip Protection Act of 1984.

== Gallery ==
Die shot of an Intel D8742 Microcontroller

Die shot of Hitachi HD61914 SRAM

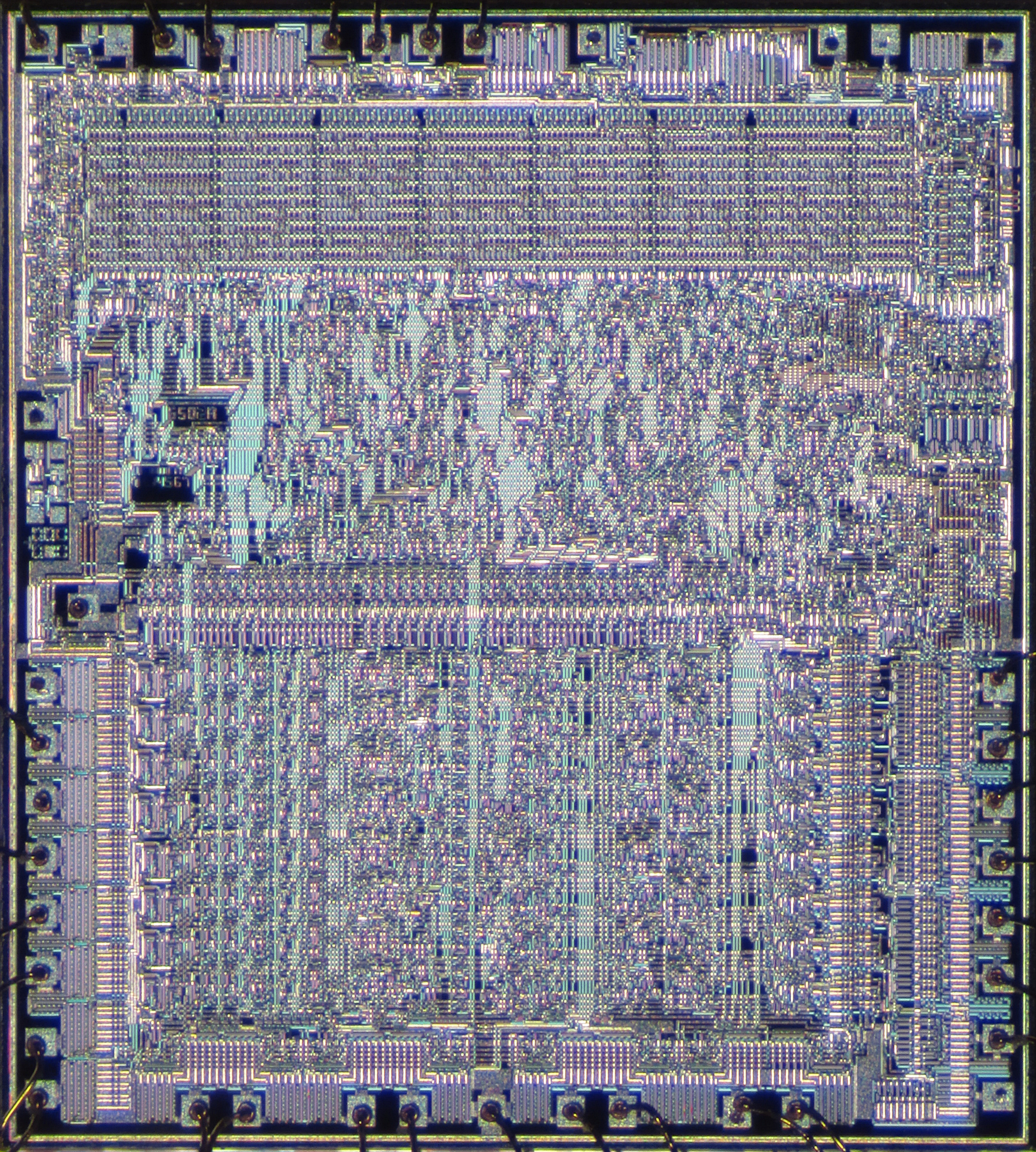
Die shot of the MOS Technology 6502

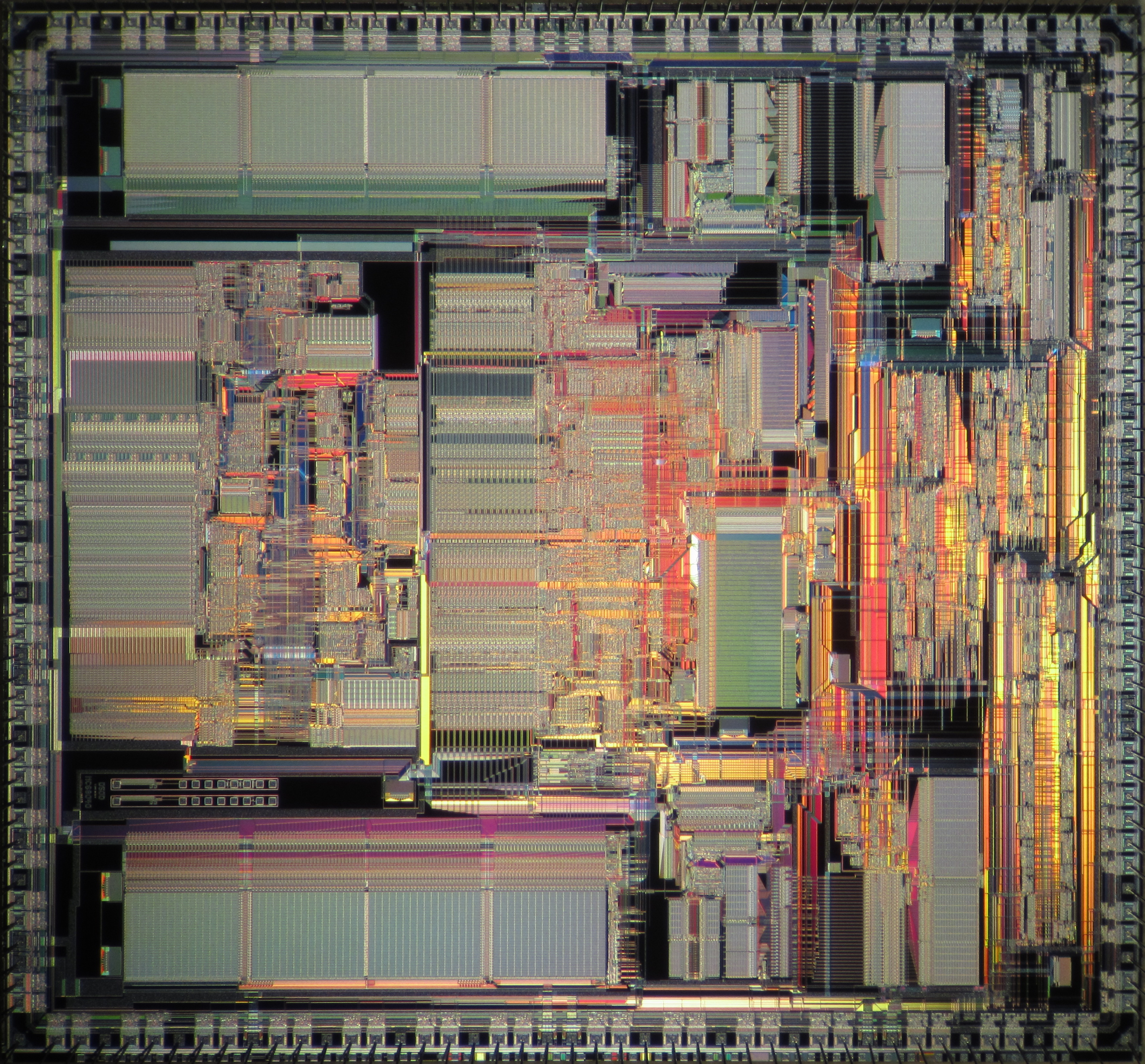
Die shot of a Motorola 68040-microprocessor

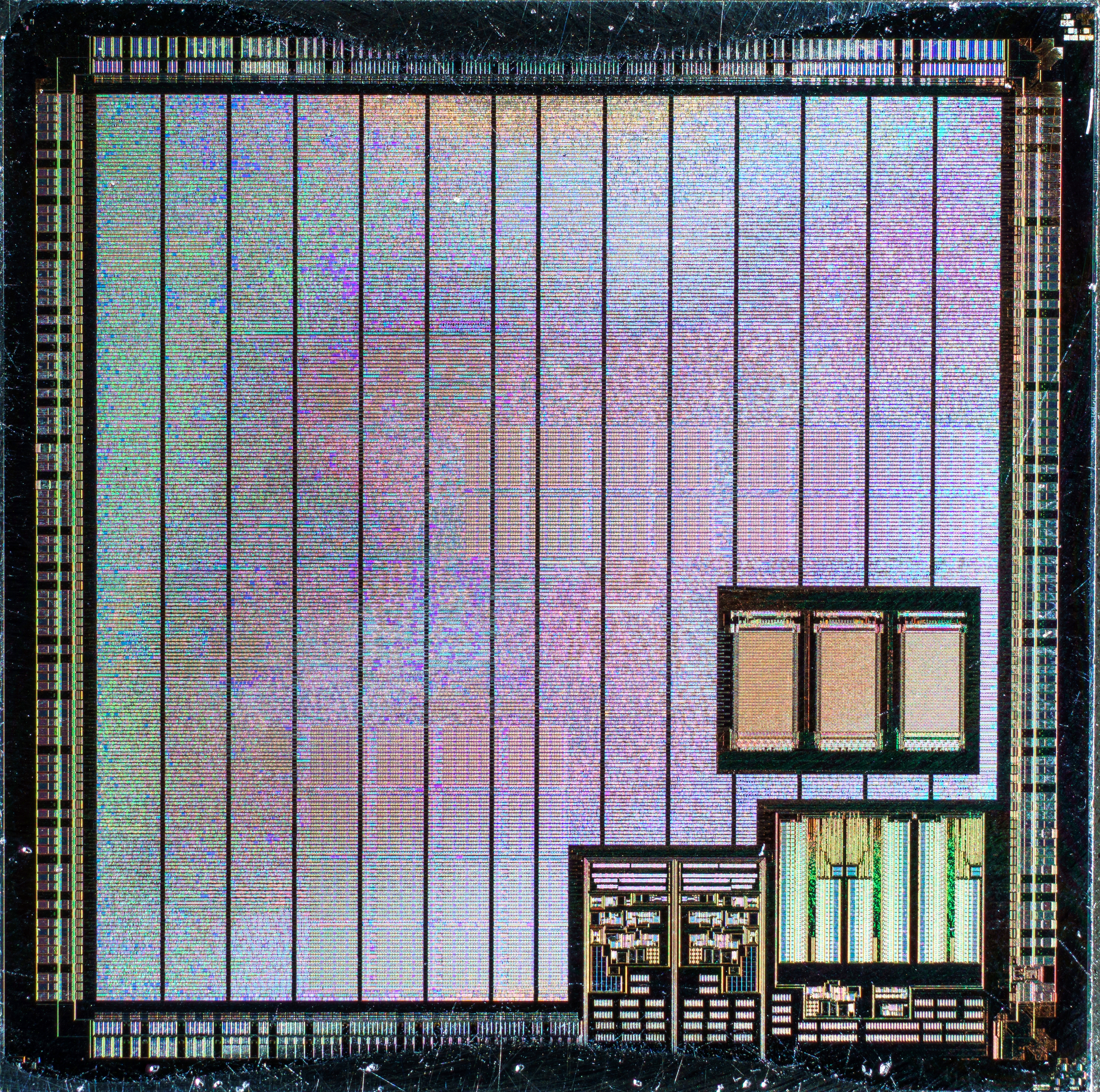
Die shot of a Matrox Mystique IS-MGA-1064SG graphics chips; most of the processor is covered by a power distribution network.

Die shot of an Intel Pentium II

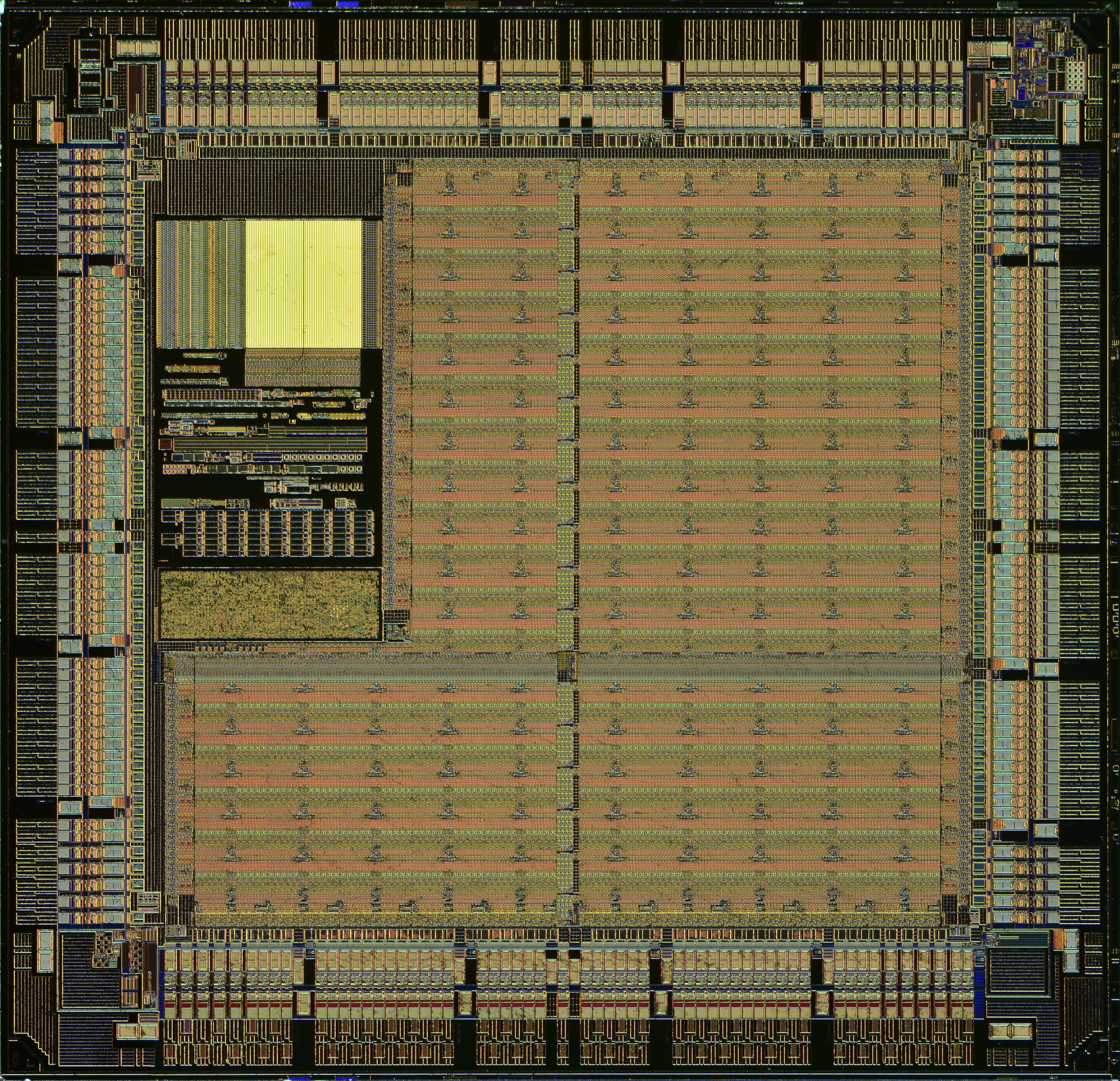
Die shot of an Altera Max II FPGA

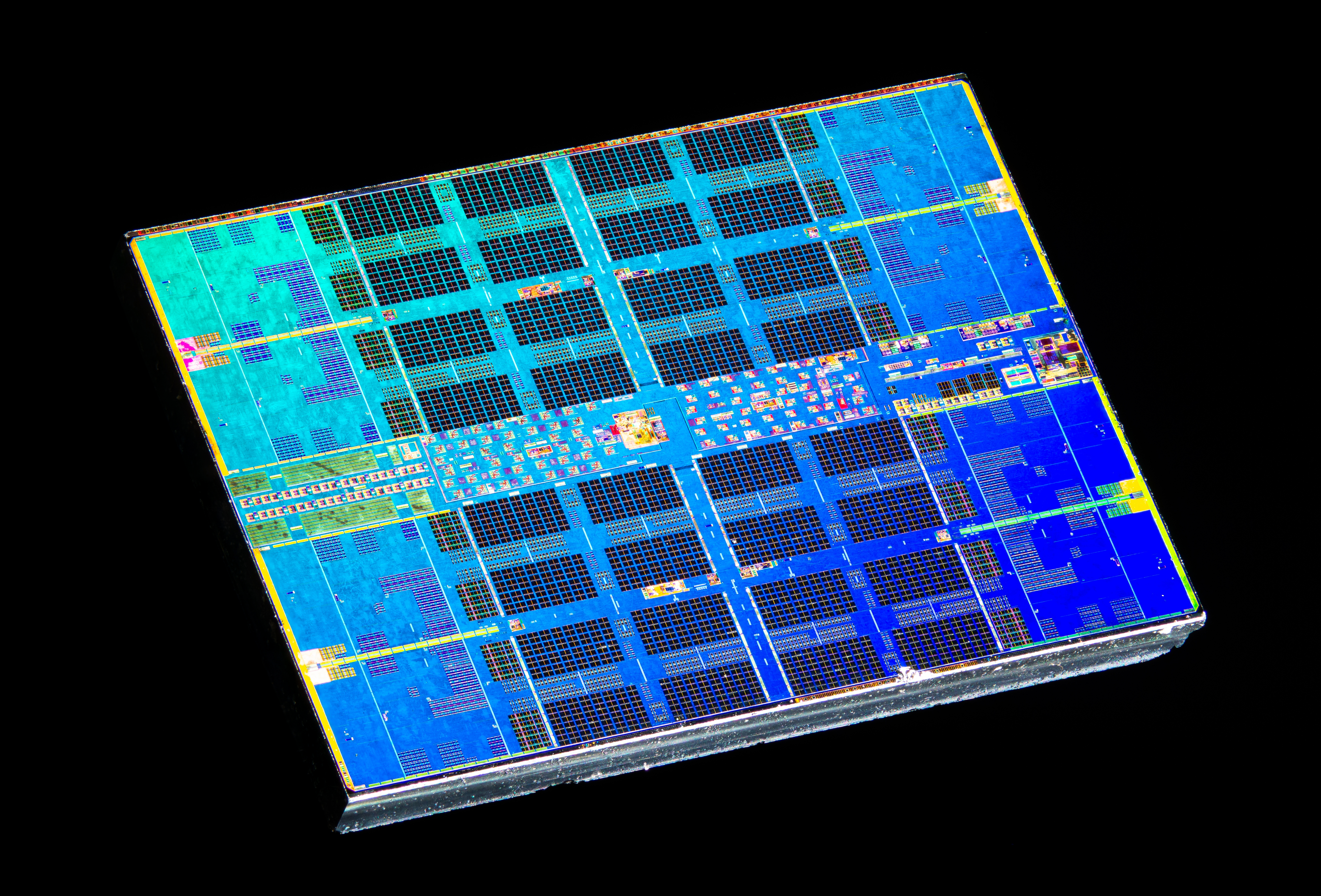
Die shot of an AMD Zen 2 Ryzen-microprocessor

== See also ==
- Die (integrated circuit)
