= NexGen =

American semiconductor company

NexGen, Inc.
- Industry: Semiconductors
- Founded: 1986; 40 years ago
- Defunct: January 16, 1996; 30 years ago
- Fate: Acquired by AMD
- Headquarters: Milpitas, California, US
- Key people: Dr. A. Thampy Thomas
- Products: Microprocessors
- Parent: AMD
- Website: www.nexgen.com (archived page from 1996-11-12)

NexGen, Inc. was a private semiconductor company based in Milpitas, California, that designed x86 microprocessors until it was purchased by AMD on January 16, 1996. NexGen was a fabless design house that designed its chips but relied on other companies for production. NexGen's chips were produced by IBM's Microelectronics division in Burlington, Vermont, alongside PowerPC and DRAM parts.

The company was best known for the unique implementation of the x86 architecture in its processors. NexGen's CPUs were designed very differently from other processors based on the x86 instruction set at the time: the processor would translate code designed to run on the traditionally CISC-based x86 architecture to run on the chip's internal RISC architecture. The architecture was used in later AMD chips such as the K6, and to an extent most x86 processors today implement a "hybrid" architecture similar to those used in NexGen's processors.

The company went public in 1994, and was bought by AMD in 1995 for $850 million. The technology forms the platform architecture for all of AMD's current microprocessors. It was an unusual start-up in its time as the original funding came from corporate investors, Compaq and Olivetti, joined in a later round by venture capital firm Kleiner Perkins.

== History ==
The company was founded in 1986 by Thampy Thomas, being funded by Compaq, ASCII and Kleiner Perkins. Its first design was targeted at the 80386 generation of processors. But the design was so large and complicated it could only be implemented using eight chips instead of one and by the time it was ready, the industry had moved onto the 80486 generation.

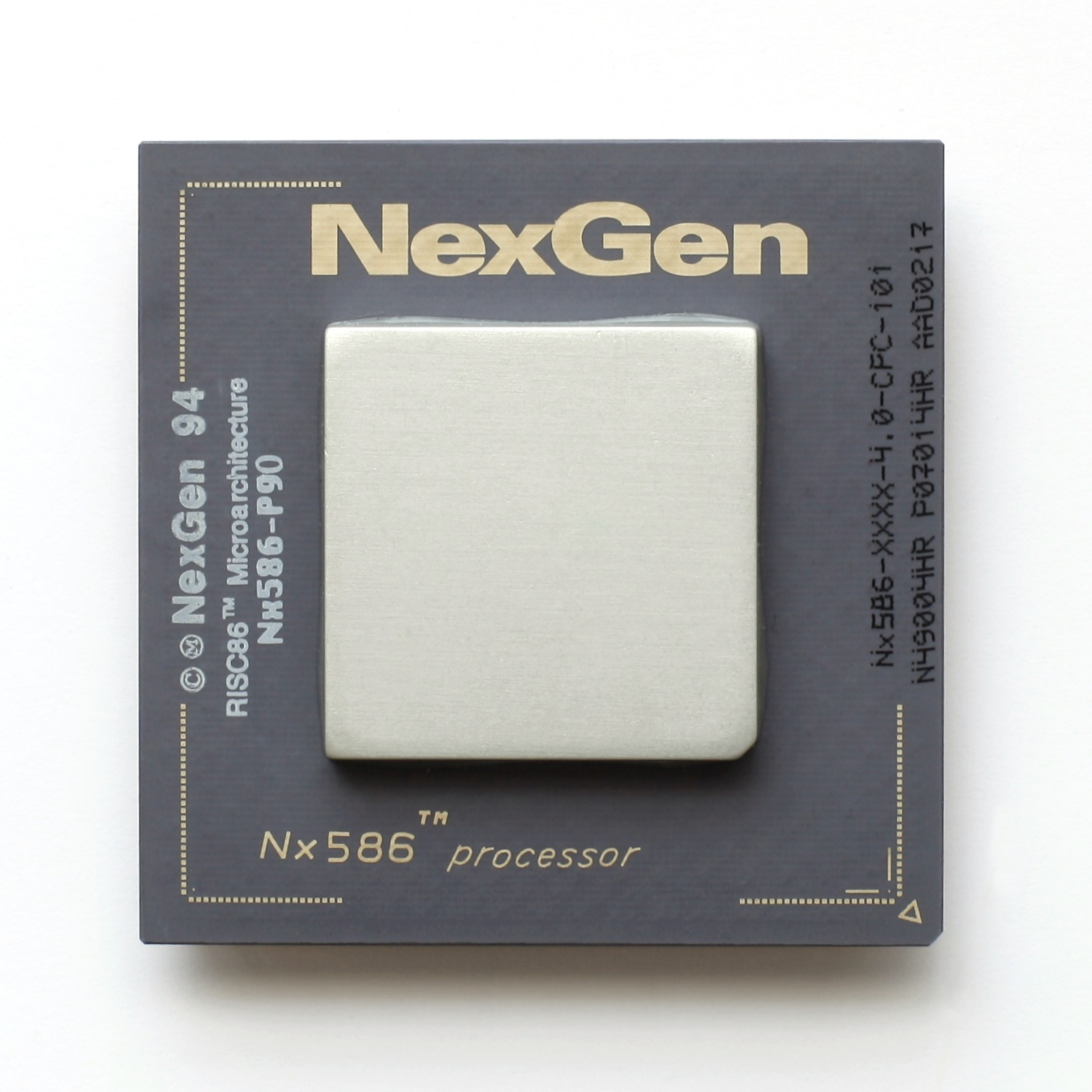
A NexGen Nx586 processor

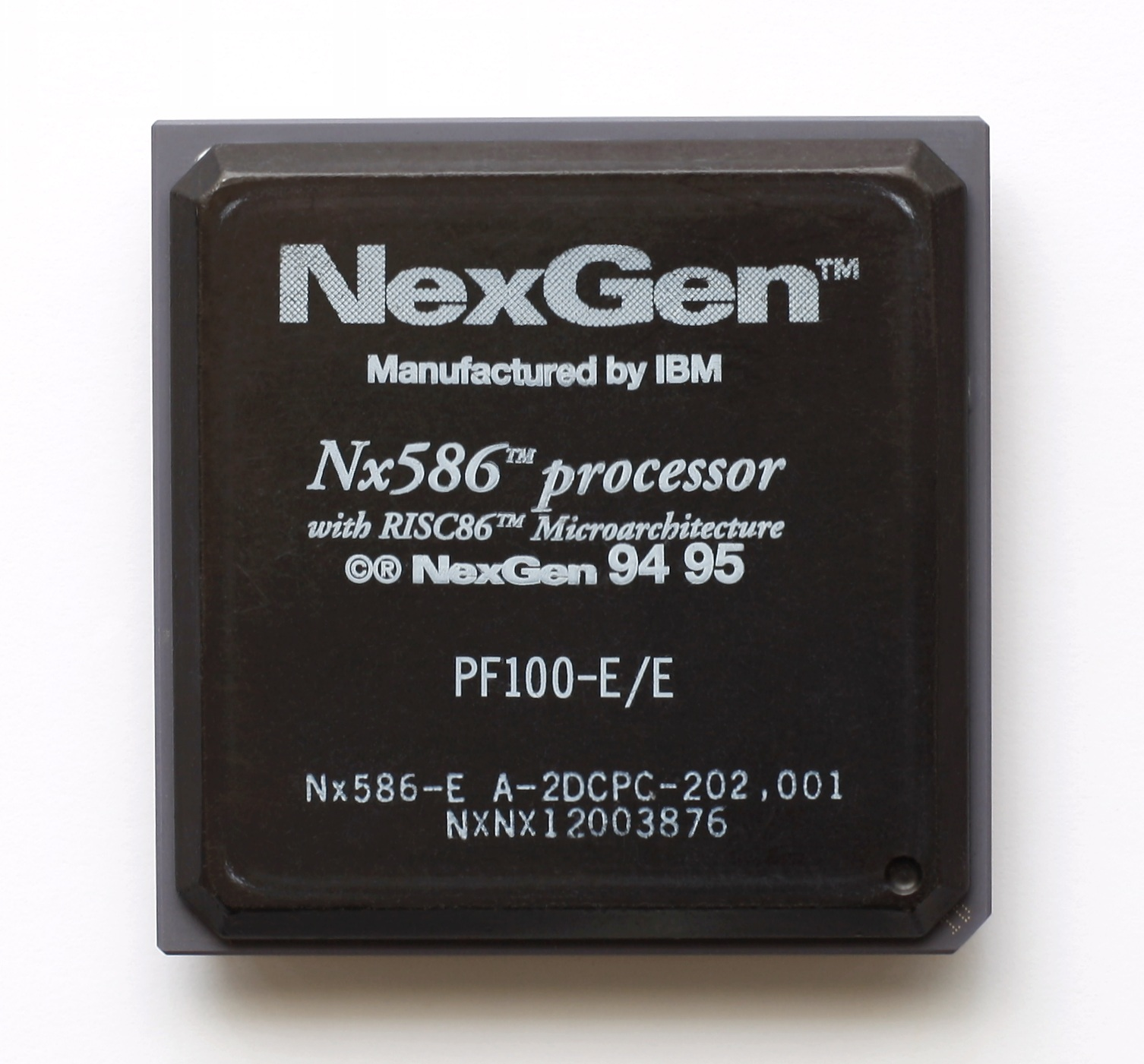
A NexGen Nx586PF processor

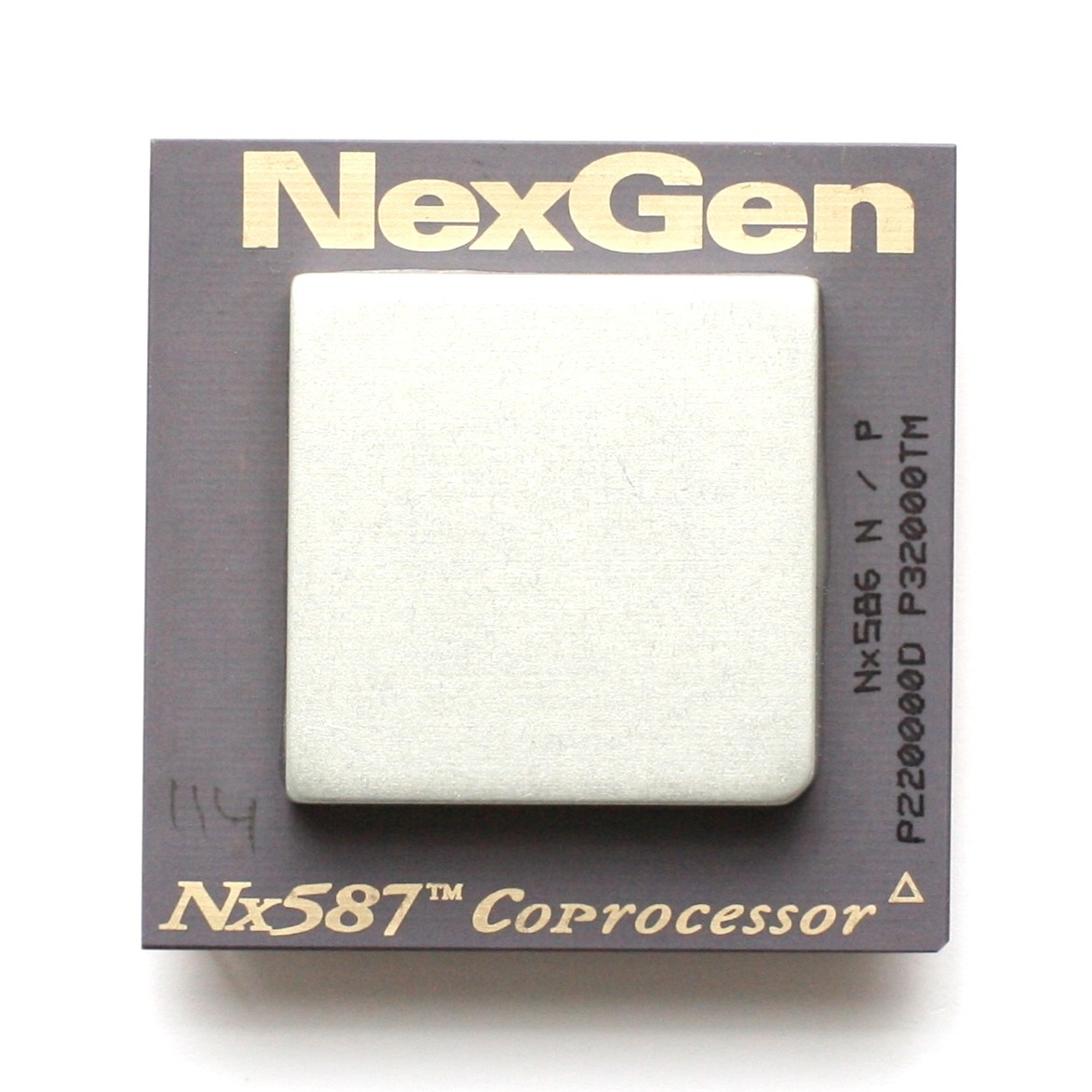
A NexGen Nx587 FPU

Its second design, the Nx586 CPU, introduced in 1994, was the first CPU to attempt to compete directly against Intel's Pentium, with its Nx586-P80 and Nx586-P90 CPUs. Unlike competing chips from AMD and Cyrix, the Nx586 was not pin-compatible with the Pentium or any other Intel chip and required its own custom NxVL-based motherboard and chipset. NexGen offered both a VLB and a PCI motherboard for the Nx586 chips.

Like the later Pentium-class CPUs from AMD and Cyrix, clock for clock it was more efficient than the Pentium, so the P80 ran at 75 MHz and the P90 ran at 83.3 MHz. Unfortunately for NexGen, it measured its performance relative to a Pentium using an early chipset; improvements included in Intel's first Triton chipset increased the Pentium's performance relative to the Nx586 and NexGen had difficulty keeping up. Furthermore, PCs identified the Nx586 as an 80386 processor; as a result many applications that require a processor faster than a 386 will not work unless CPU identification software is active. Unlike the Pentium, the Nx586 had no built-in math coprocessor; an optional Nx587 provided this functionality.

In later Nx586s, an x87 math coprocessor was included on-chip. Using IBM's multichip module (MCM) technology, NexGen combined the 586 and 587 die in a single package. The new device, which used the same pinout as its predecessor, was marketed as the Nx586-PF100 to distinguish it from the FPU-less Nx586-P100.

Compaq, which had backed the company financially, announced its intention to use the Nx586 and even struck the name "Pentium" from its product literature, demos, and boxes, substituting the "586" moniker, but never used NexGen's chip widely. Instead, Alaris, Inc., a smaller computer systems maker, became the first company to ship a computer with the Nx586 in fall 1994.

AMD purchased NexGen when AMD's K5 chip failed to meet performance and sales expectations. Some NexGen customers were even given free AMD K5 CPUs with motherboards in exchange for sending in their NexGen hardware.

Development of AMD's internal K5 successor was halted in favor of continuing from NexGen's Nx686 designs, eventually becoming K6.
