= Decapping =

Removing the protective cover of an integrated circuit

Decapping (decapsulation) or delidding of an integrated circuit (IC) is the process of removing the protective cover or integrated heat spreader (IHS) of an integrated circuit so that the contained die is revealed for visual inspection of the micro circuitry imprinted on the die. This process is typically done in order to debug a manufacturing problem with the chip, or possibly to copy information from the device, to check for counterfeit chips or to reverse engineer it. Companies such as TechInsights and ChipRebel decap, take die shots of, and reverse engineer chips for customers. Modern integrated circuits can be encapsulated in plastic, ceramic, or epoxy packages.

Delidding may also be done to test the chip for radiation-tolerance with a heavy-ion beam or in an effort to reduce the operating temperatures of an integrated circuit such as a processor, by replacing the thermal interface material (TIM) between the die and the IHS with a higher-quality TIM. With care, it's possible to decap a device and still leave it functional.

== Method ==
Decapping is usually carried out by chemical etching of the covering, laser cutting, laser evaporation of the covering, plasma etching or mechanical removal of the cover using a milling machine, saw blade, using hot air or by desoldering and cutting. The process can be either destructive or non-destructive of the internal die.

Chemical etching usually involves subjecting the (if made of plastic) IC package to concentrated or fuming nitric acid, heated concentrated sulfuric acid, white fuming nitric acid or a mixture of the two for some time, possibly while applying heat externally with a hot plate or hot air gun, which dissolves the package while leaving the die intact. The acids are dangerous, so protective equipment such as appropriate gloves, full face respirator with appropriate acid cartridges, a lab coat and a fume hood are required. Alternatively, using hot air the black packaging compound such as that in DIP packages is weakened, and tweezers are used to crumble the epoxy, revealing the die.

Laser decapping scans a high power laser beam across the plastic IC package to vaporize it, while avoiding the actual silicon die.

In a common version of non-destructive, mechanical delidding, one removes the IHS of an IC such as a computer processor using an oven to soften the solder (if present) between the IHS and the die(s) and using a knife to cut the adhesive in the periphery of the IHS, which joins the IHS with the processor package substrate, which is often a specialized printed circuit board often only called a substrate or sometimes an interposer. In many processors the dies are also soldered to the IHS which can still be removed by applying heat until the solder melts, and removing the IHS while the solder is still liquid. The die(s) are mounted on the substrate using flip chip.

== Gallery ==
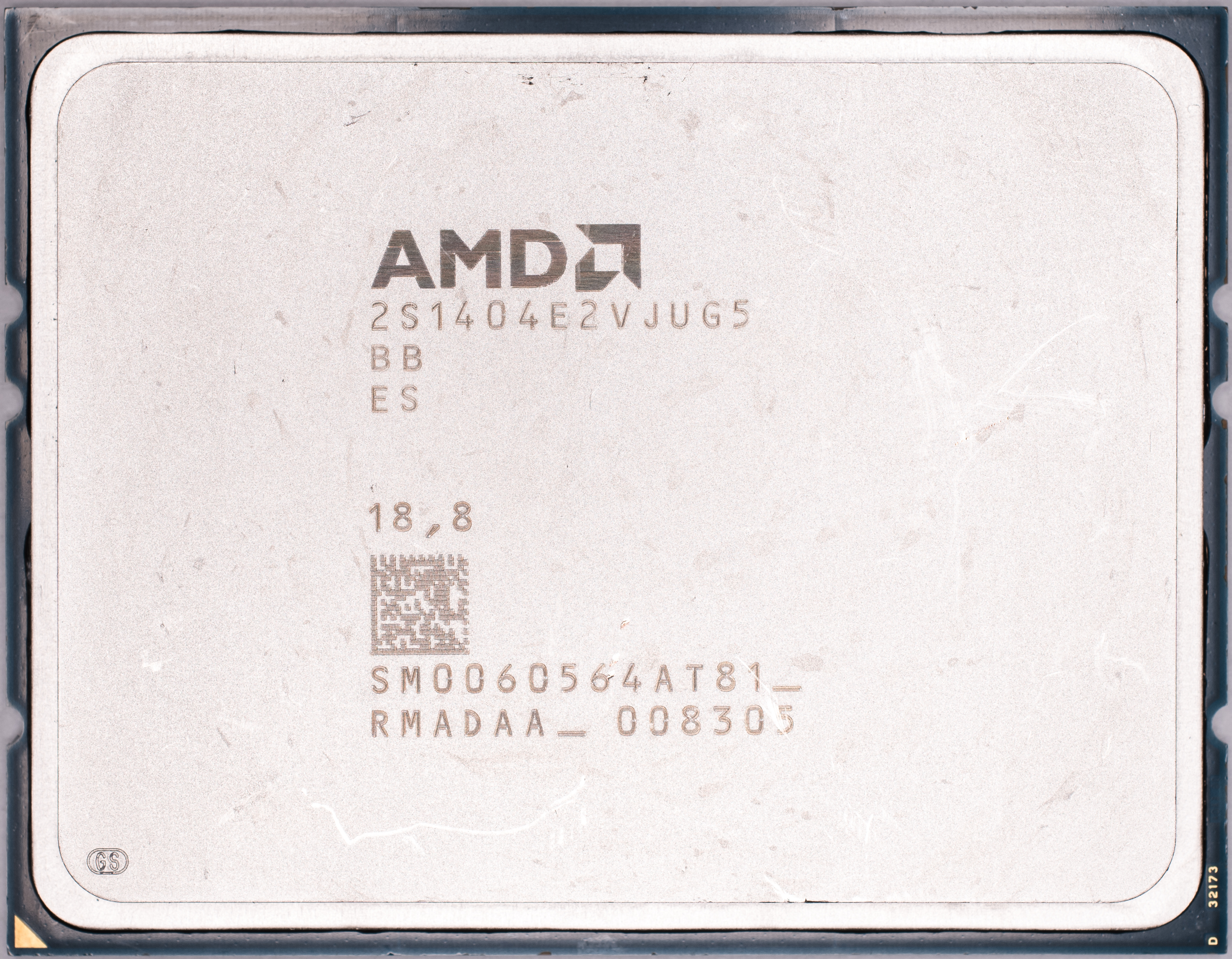
AMD Zen 2 EPYC 7702 server processor, before delidding

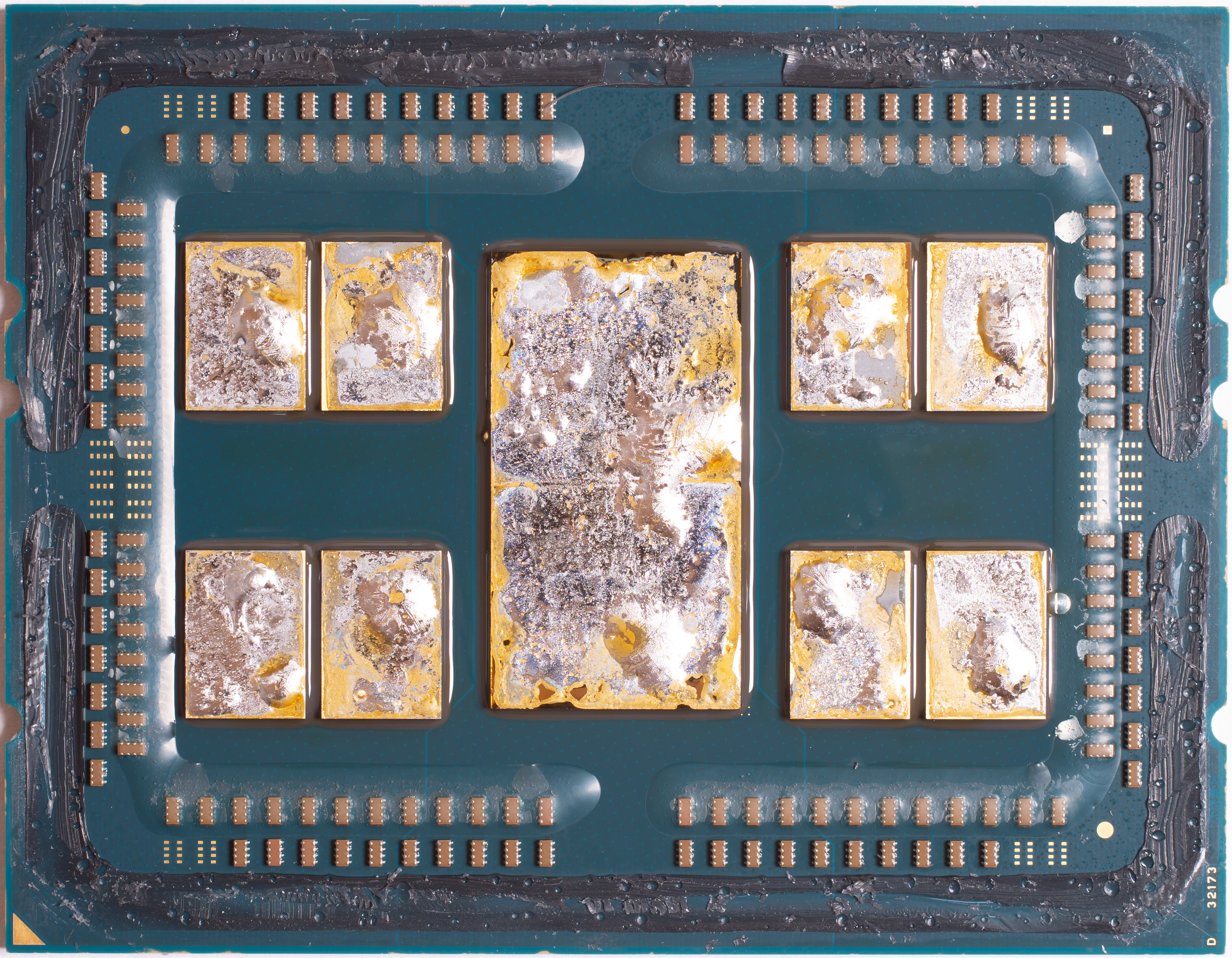
AMD EPYC 7702 after delidding, with remains of solder thermal interface material (TIM)

Removed and flipped over center die before metallization etching; visible are pads for flip chip solder balls

Die shot of the center die, after removal from processor package substrate and metallization etching

Die shot of one of the 8 other dies on the processor, after metallization etching

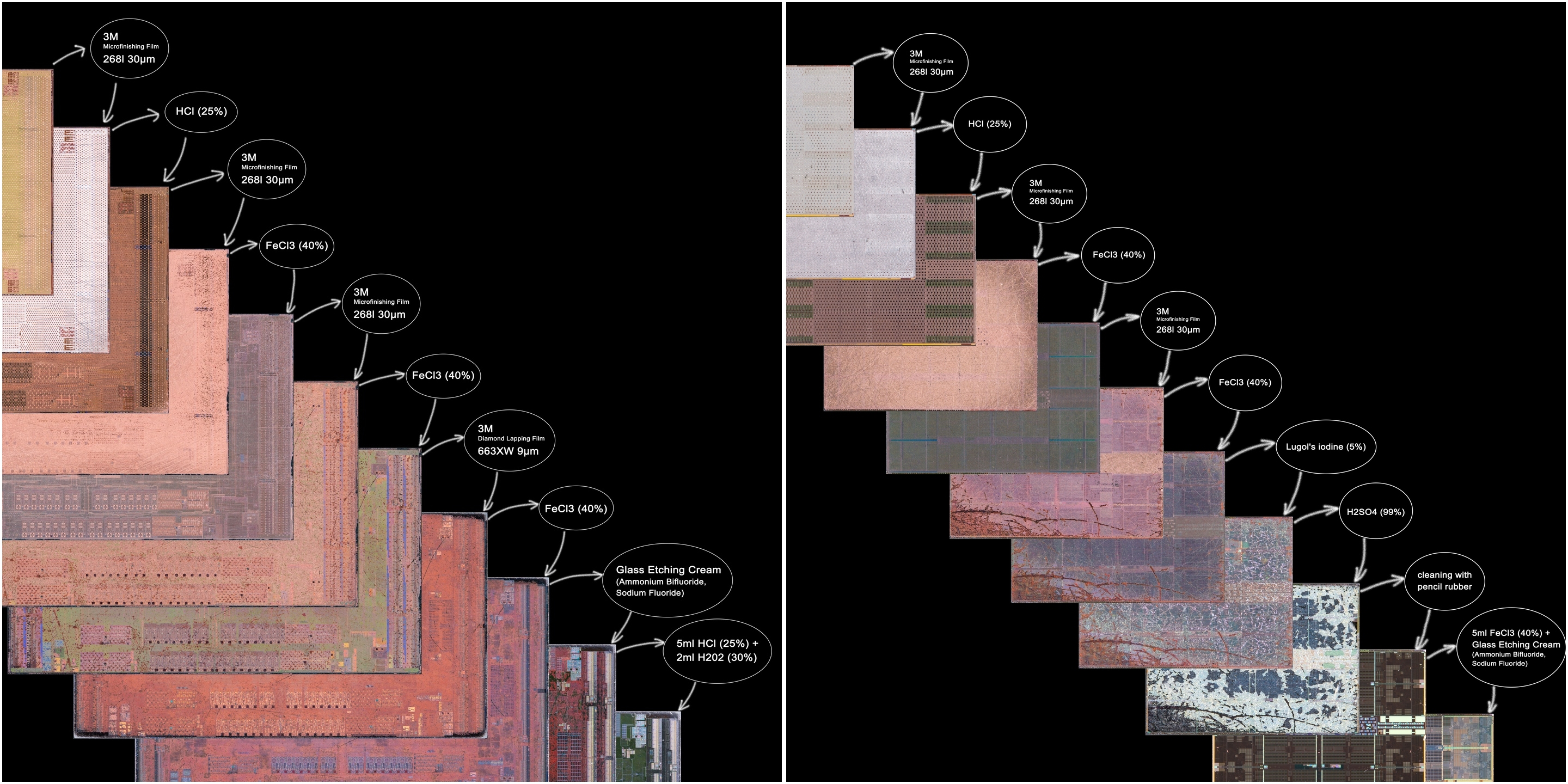
Copper interconnect (metallization) etching (removal) steps

== See also ==
- Die shot
- Reverse engineering
- Sample preparation equipment
