= Demand-based switching =

Computer technology term

Demand-based switching (DBS) is a computer technology term which refers to the process of using software to optimize the use of hardware resources.

Intel uses demand-based switching power management technology to control power voltage consumption at different states of a computer's operations. DBS routines select a minimum clock speed of the microprocessor appropriate to the workload which specific tasks being performed by the computer place on the processor. This results in less electricity being consumed, both by the processor and by fans counteracting excess heat output.

Intel's processor technology takes advantage of DBS techniques. AMD processors uses a similar process, which the company calls "Power Now".

Demand-based switching is also sometimes used in route-caching routines in local area networks to ensure efficient packet switching and traffic flow. Software DBS algorithms are frequently used in Linux servers.
