= List of Intel Pentium III processors =

The Pentium III from Intel is a sixth-generation CPU targeted at the consumer market.

== Desktop processors ==
=== "Katmai" (250 nm) ===
- 9.5 million transistors
- All models support: MMX, SSE
- The 'B' suffix denotes a 133 MHz FSB
- The '80525PYxxx512' number denotes an OEM CPU while the 'BX80525xxxx512' or 'BX80525xxxx512E' number denotes a boxed CPU
- The L2 cache is off-die and runs at 50% CPU speed.

Model	Clock rate	L2 cache	FSB	Mult.	Voltage	TDP	Socket	Release date	Release price (USD)
Pentium III 450	450 MHz	512 KB	100 MT/s	4.5×	1.93–2.07 V	25.3 W	Slot 1	February 26, 1999	$496
Pentium III 500	500 MHz	512 KB	100 MT/s	5×	1.93–2.07 V	28 W	Slot 1	February 26, 1999	$696
Pentium III 533B	533 MHz	512 KB	133 MT/s	4×	1.93–2.07 V	29.7 W	Slot 1	September 27, 1999	$369
Pentium III 550	550 MHz	512 KB	100 MT/s	5.5×	1.93–2.07 V	30.8 W	Slot 1	May 17, 1999	$700
Pentium III 600	600 MHz	512 KB	100 MT/s	6×	1.98–2.12 V	34.5 W	Slot 1	August 2, 1999	$669
Pentium III 600B	600 MHz	512 KB	133 MT/s	4.5×	1.98–2.12 V	34.5 W	Slot 1	September 27, 1999	$615

=== "Coppermine" (180 nm) ===
- 28 million transistors
- All models support: MMX, SSE
- The 'B' suffix denotes a 133 MHz FSB when the same speed was also available with a 100 MHz FSB.
- The 'E' suffix denotes a processor with support for Intel's Advanced Transfer Cache in Intel documentation; in reality it indicates a Coppermine core when the same speed was available as either Katmai or Coppermine. The 'E' suffix was not used on speeds faster than Katmai was available on, unless the 'B' suffix was also present; but all Coppermine CPUs have the Advanced Transfer Cache.
- The L2 cache runs at 100% CPU speed

Model number	sSpec number	Frequency	L2 Cache	FSB	Mult	Voltage	TDP	Socket	Release date	Part number(s)	Release price (USD)
Pentium III 500E	SL3R2, SL446, SL45R, SL3Q9	500 MHz	256 KB	100 MHz	5×	1.6 V	13.2 W	Socket 370	October 25, 1999	RB80526PY500256	$239
Pentium III 500E	SL3US	500 MHz	256 KB	100 MHz	5×	1.6 V	13.2 W	Slot 1	October 25, 1999	80526PY500256	$239
Pentium III 533EB	SL3VA, SL3VF, SL45S, SL3SX	533 MHz	256 KB	133 MHz	4×	1.65 V	14 W	Socket 370	October 25, 1999	RB80526PZ533256	$305
Pentium III 533EB	SL3N6, SL3SX, SL3XG, SL44W	533 MHz	256 KB	133 MHz	4×	1.65 V	14 W	Slot 1	October 25, 1999	80526PZ533256	$305
Pentium III 550E	SL3R3, SL44G, SL45T, SL3QA	550 MHz	256 KB	100 MHz	5.5×	1.6–1.7 V	14.5 W	Socket 370	October 25, 1999	RB80526PY550256	$368
Pentium III 550E	SL3V5, SL44X, SL3N7	550 MHz	256 KB	100 MHz	5.5×	1.6–1.7 V	14.5 W	Slot 1	October 25, 1999	80526PY550256	$368
Pentium III 600E	SL3NL, SL45U, SL5BT, SL3VH, SL3XU, SL4CM	600 MHz	256 KB	100 MHz	6×	1.7–1.75 V	19.5 W	Socket 370	October 25, 1999	RB80526PY600256	$455
Pentium III 600E	SL3H6, SL4C7, SL3NA, SL44Y, SL43E	600 MHz	256 KB	100 MHz	6×	1.7–1.75 V	19.5 W	Slot 1	October 25, 1999	80526PY600256	$455
Pentium III 600EB	SL3VB, SL45V, SL3XT, SL4CL, SL3VG	600 MHz	256 KB	133 MHz	4.5×	1.65–1.7 V	15.8 W	Socket 370	October 25, 1999	RB80526PZ600256	$455
Pentium III 600EB	SL3H7, SL3NB, SL3XJ, SL44Z, SL4C6	600 MHz	256 KB	133 MHz	4.5×	1.65–1.7 V	15.8 W	Slot 1	October 25, 1999	80526PZ600256	$455
Pentium III 650	SL3NM, SL3XV, SL45W, SL3VJ, SL4CK	650 MHz	256 KB	100 MHz	6.5×	1.65–1.7 V	17 W	Socket 370	October 25, 1999	RB80526PY650256	$583
Pentium III 650	SL3KV, SL4C5, SL3XK, SL3NR, SL452	650 MHz	256 KB	100 MHz	6.5×	1.65–1.7 V	17 W	Slot 1	October 25, 1999	80526PY650256	$583
Pentium III 667	SL3T2, SL3XW, SL45X, SL3VK, SL4CJ	667 MHz	256 KB	133 MHz	5×	1.65–1.7 V	17.5 W	Socket 370	October 25, 1999	RB80526PZ667256	$605
Pentium III 667	SL3KW, SL3ND, SL3XL, SL453, SL4G6, SL4C4	667 MHz	256 KB	133 MHz	5×	1.65–1.7 V	17.5 W	Slot 1	October 25, 1999	80526PZ667256	$605
Pentium III 700	SL3T3, SL45Y, SL4M7, SL3VL, SL3XX, SL4CH, SL4ZM	700 MHz	256 KB	100 MHz	7×	1.65–1.7 V	18.3 W	Socket 370	October 25, 1999	RB80526PY700256	$754
Pentium III 700	SL3SY, SL3XM, SL454, SL3S9, SL4C3	700 MHz	256 KB	100 MHz	7×	1.65–1.7 V	18.3 W	Slot 1	October 25, 1999	80526PY700256	$754
Pentium III 733	SL3T4, SL3XY, SL4M8, SL45Z, SL4CG, SL3VM, SL4ZL	733 MHz	256 KB	133 MHz	5.5×	1.65–1.75 V	19.1 W	Socket 370	October 25, 1999	RB80526PZ733256	$776
Pentium III 733	SL3SB, SL3XN, SL3SZ, SL4FQ, SL455, SL4KD, SL4C2, SL4CX	733 MHz	256 KB	133 MHz	5.5×	1.65–1.75 V	19.1 W	Slot 1	October 25, 1999	80526PZ733256	$776
Pentium III 750	SL3VC, SL4M9, SL3XZ, SL462, SL4CF, SL3VN	750 MHz	256 KB	100 MHz	7.5×	1.65–1.75 V	19.5 W	Socket 370	December 20, 1999	RB80526PY750256	$803
Pentium III 750	SL3V6, SL3WC, SL3XP, SL4KE, SL456, SL4BZ	750 MHz	256 KB	100 MHz	7.5×	1.65–1.75 V	19.5 W	Slot 1	December 20, 1999	80526PY750256	$803
Pentium III 800	SL3Y3, SL463, SL4CE, SL4MA, SL3X4, SL4ZN, SL65C	800 MHz	256 KB	100 MHz	8×	1.65–1.75 V	20.8 W	Socket 370	December 20, 1999	RB80526PY800256	$851
Pentium III 800	SL3Z6, SL4BY, SL3XR, SL457, SL4KF	800 MHz	256 KB	100 MHz	8×	1.65–1.75 V	20.8 W	Slot 1	December 20, 1999	80526PY800256	$851
Pentium III 800EB	SL3VE, SL4CD, SL4MB, SL464, SL52P, SL3WB, SL3Y2	800 MHz	256 KB	133 MHz	6×	1.65–1.75 V	20.8 W	Socket 370	December 20, 1999	RB80526PZ800256	$851
Pentium III 800EB	SL3V8, SL4KG, SL4BX, SL458, SL4G7, SL3WA, SL3XQ	800 MHz	256 KB	133 MHz	6×	1.65–1.75 V	20.8 W	Slot 1	December 20, 1999	80526PZ800256	$851
Pentium III 850	SL4MC, SL43H, SL49G, SL4CC, SL4Z2	850 MHz	256 KB	100 MHz	8.5×	1.65–1.75 V	25.7 W	Socket 370	March 20, 2000	RB80526PY850256	$765
Pentium III 850	SL4BW, SL43F, SL47M, SL4KH	850 MHz	256 KB	100 MHz	8.5×	1.65–1.75 V	25.7 W	Slot 1	March 20, 2000	80526PY850256	$765
Pentium III 866	SL49H, SL4MD, SL43J, SL4ZJ, SL5DX, SL4CB, SL5B5, SL5HK	866 MHz	256 KB	133 MHz	6.5×	1.65–1.75 V	22.5/22.9 W	Socket 370	March 20, 2000	RB80526PZ866256	$776
Pentium III 866	SL4BV, SL4KJ, SL47N, SL47S, SL43G	866 MHz	256 KB	133 MHz	6.5×	1.65–1.75 V	22.5/22.9 W	Slot 1	March 20, 2000	80526PZ866256	$776
Pentium III 900	SL4SD, SL5BS	900 MHz	256 KB	100 MHz	9×	1.7–1.75 V	28.9 W	Socket 370	October 2000	RB80526PY900256	
Pentium III 933	SL49J, SL4ME, SL52Q, SL44J, SL4C9, SL5DW, SL5U3, SL5B4, SL5HL	933 MHz	256 KB	133 MHz	7×	1.65–1.75 V	24.5/27.3 W	Socket 370	May 24, 2000	RB80526PZ933256	$744
Pentium III 933	SL4BT, SL448, SL47Q	933 MHz	256 KB	133 MHz	7×	1.65–1.75 V	24.5/27.3 W	Slot 1	May 24, 2000	80526PZ933256	$744
Pentium III 1000	SL5QV	1 GHz	256 KB	100 MHz	10×	1.75 V	29 W	Socket 370	March 8, 2000	RB80526PY001256	$990
Pentium III 1000	SL4BR, SL4KL	1 GHz	256 KB	100 MHz	10×	1.75 V	29 W	Slot 1	March 8, 2000	80526PY1000256	$990
Pentium III 1000EB	SL4C8, SL4MF, SL52R, SL5B3, SL5DV, SL5FQ, SL4WM	1 GHz	256 KB	133 MHz	7.5×	1.7–1.76 V	29 W	Socket 370	March 8, 2000	RB80526PZ001256	$990
Pentium III 1000EB	SL4BS, SL48S	1 GHz	256 KB	133 MHz	7.5×	1.7–1.76 V	29 W	Slot 1	March 8, 2000	80526PZ1000256	$990
Pentium III 1100	SL5QW	1.1 GHz	256 KB	100 MHz	11×	1.75 V	33 W	Socket 370	June 2000	RB80526PY005256	
Pentium III 1133	SL5B2, SL4YV	1.13 GHz	256 KB	133 MHz	8.5×	1.75 V	33 W	Socket 370	July 31, 2000	RK80526PZ006256	$990
Pentium III 1133	SL4HH	1.13 GHz	256 KB	133 MHz	8.5×	1.8 V	33 W	Slot 1	July 31, 2000	80526PZ1133256	$990

=== "Coppermine T" (180 nm) ===
- All models support: MMX, SSE
- The L2 cache runs at 100% CPU speed

Model number	sSpec number	Frequency	L2 Cache	FSB	Mult	Voltage	TDP	Socket	Release date	Part number(s)	Release price (USD)
Pentium III 800	SL5QD	800 MHz	256 KB	133 MHz	6×	1.75 V	20.8 W	Socket 370	June 2001	RB80533PZ800256	
Pentium III 866	SL5HG, SL5QE	866 MHz	256 KB	133 MHz	6.5×	1.75 V	26.1 W	Socket 370	June 2001	RK80533PZ866256	
Pentium III 933	SL5HH, SL5QF	933 MHz	256 KB	133 MHz	7×	1.75 V	27.3 W	Socket 370	June 2001	RK80533PZ933256	
Pentium III 1000	SL5QJ	1000 MHz	256 KB	133 MHz	7.5×	1.75 V	29.0 W	Socket 370	June 2001	RK80533PZ001256	
Pentium III 1133	SL5QK	1133 MHz	256 KB	133 MHz	8.5×	1.75 V	29.1 W	Socket 370	June 2001	RK80533PZ006256	$990

=== "Tualatin" (130 nm) ===
- 47 million transistors
- All models support: MMX, SSE
- The 'S' suffix denotes the presence of 512 KB L2 cache and dual-processor capability.
- The Tualatin-class Pentium IIIs did not include the controversial Processor Serial Number feature that was present in the earlier Pentium IIIs
- The L2 cache runs at 100% CPU speed
- Tualatin (S) supports up to 4 GB of memory (PC133 MHz ECC SDRAM DIMM - 4x1GB)

Model number	sSpec number	Frequency	L2 Cache	FSB	Mult	Voltage	TDP	Socket	Release date	Part number(s)	Release price (USD)
Pentium III 1000	SL5GR	1 GHz	256 KB	133 MHz	7.5×	1.475 V	29.9 W	Socket 370	July 2001	RK80530PZ001256	
Pentium III 1000S	SL5PS	1 GHz	512 KB	133 MHz	7.5×	1.475 V	29.9 W	Socket 370	June 2001	RK80530KZ001512	
Pentium III 1133	SL5GQ, SL5LT, SL6C4, SL6JK	1.13 GHz	256 KB	133 MHz	8.5×	1.475 V	29.1 W	Socket 370	July 2001	RK80530PZ006256	$268
Pentium III 1133S	SL5LV, SL5PU, SL6BW, SL6JM	1.13 GHz	512 KB	133 MHz	8.5×	1.45 V	27.9 W / 28.7 W	Socket 370	June 2001	RK80530KZ006512	
Pentium III 1200	SL5GN, SL5PM, SL6C3, SL6JL	1.2 GHz	256 KB	133 MHz	9×	1.475 V	29.9 W	Socket 370	July 2001	RK80530PZ009256	$294
Pentium III 1266S	SL5LW, SL5QL, SL6BX, SL6JN	1.26 GHz	512 KB	133 MHz	9.5×	1.45 V	30.4 W	Socket 370	July 2001	RK80530KZ012512	
Pentium III 1333	SL5VX, SL6BZ, SL6HS	1.33 GHz	256 KB	133 MHz	10×	1.475 V	29.9 W	Socket 370	December 2001	RK80530PZ014256	
Pentium III 1400	SL64W, SL6C2, SL6HR	1.4 GHz	256 KB	133 MHz	10.5×	1.5 V	31.2 W	Socket 370	December 2001	RK80530PZ017256	
Pentium III 1400S	SL5XL, SL657, SL6BY, SL6JP	1.4 GHz	512 KB	133 MHz	10.5×	1.45 V	32.2 W	Socket 370	January 8, 2002	RK80530KZ017512	$315

== Mobile processors ==
=== "Coppermine" (180 nm) ===
- All models support: MMX, SSE

Model	Clock rate	L2 cache	FSB	Mult.	Voltage	TDP	Socket	Release date	Release price (USD)
Mobile Pentium III 400	400 MHz	256 KB	100 MT/s	4×	1.35–1.6 V	10.1 W	BGA2	October 25, 1999	$348
Mobile Pentium III 450	450 MHz	256 KB	100 MT/s	4.5×	1.1–1.7 V	15.5 W	BGA2; μPGA2	October 25, 1999	$348
Mobile Pentium III 500	500 MHz	256 KB	100 MT/s	5×	1.35–1.6 V	16.8 W	BGA2; μPGA2	October 25, 1999	$530
Mobile Pentium III 600	600 MHz	256 KB	100 MT/s	6×	1.1–1.6 V	34.5 W	BGA2; μPGA2	January 18, 2000	$423
Mobile Pentium III 650	650 MHz	256 KB	100 MT/s	6.5×	1.35–1.6 V	21.5 W	BGA2; μPGA2	January 18, 2000	$637
Mobile Pentium III 700	700 MHz	256 KB	100 MT/s	7×	1.35–1.6 V	23 W	BGA2; μPGA2	April 24, 2000	$562
Mobile Pentium III 750	750 MHz	256 KB	100 MT/s	7.5×	1.35–1.6 V	24.6 W	BGA2; μPGA2	June 19, 2000	$562
Mobile Pentium III 800	800 MHz	256 KB	100 MT/s	8×	1.35–1.6 V	25.9 W	BGA2; μPGA2	September 25, 2000	$508
Mobile Pentium III 850	850 MHz	256 KB	100 MT/s	8.5×	1.35–1.6 V	27.5 W	BGA2; μPGA2	September 25, 2000	$722
Mobile Pentium III 900	900 MHz	256 KB	100 MT/s	9×	1.35–1.7 V	30.7 W	BGA2; μPGA2	March 19, 2001	$562
Mobile Pentium III 1.0	1000 MHz	256 KB	100 MT/s	10×	1.35–1.7 V	34 W	BGA2; μPGA2	March 19, 2001	$722
Mobile Pentium III LV 600	600 MHz	256 KB	100 MT/s	6×	1.1–1.35 V	14.4 W	BGA2	June 19, 2000	$316
Mobile Pentium III LV 700	700 MHz	256 KB	100 MT/s	7×	1.1–1.35 V	16.1 W	BGA2	February 27, 2001	$316
Mobile Pentium III LV 750	750 MHz	256 KB	100 MT/s	7.5×	1.1–1.35 V	17.2 W	BGA2	May 21, 2001	$316
Mobile Pentium III ULV 500	500 MHz	256 KB	100 MT/s	5×	0.975–1.1 V	8.1 W	BGA2	January 30, 2001	$208
Mobile Pentium III ULV 600	600 MHz	256 KB	100 MT/s	6×	0.975–1.1 V	9.7 W	BGA2	May 21, 2001	$209

=== "Tualatin" (130 nm) ===
- All models support: MMX, SSE

Model	Clock rate	L2 cache	FSB	Mult.	Voltage	TDP	Socket	Release date	Release price (USD)
Mobile Pentium III-M 866	867 MHz	512 KB	133 MT/s	6.5×	1.15–1.4 V	19.5 W	BGA2; μPGA2	July 30, 2001	$247
Mobile Pentium III-M 933	933 MHz	512 KB	133 MT/s	7×	1.15–1.4 V	20.1 W	BGA2; μPGA2	July 30, 2001	$278
Mobile Pentium III-M 1000	1000 MHz	512 KB	133 MT/s	7.5×	1.15–1.4 V	20.5 W	BGA2; μPGA2	July 30, 2001	$397
Mobile Pentium III-M 1066	1067 MHz	512 KB	133 MT/s	8×	1.15–1.4 V	21 W	BGA2; μPGA2	July 30, 2001	$499
Mobile Pentium III-M 1133	1133 MHz	512 KB	133 MT/s	8.5×	1.15–1.4 V	21.8 W	BGA2; μPGA2	July 30, 2001	$625
Mobile Pentium III-M 1200	1200 MHz	512 KB	133 MT/s	9×	1.15–1.4 V	22 W	BGA2; μPGA2	October 1, 2001	$722
Mobile Pentium III-M 1266	1267 MHz	512 KB	133 MT/s	9.5×	1.15–1.4 V	22 W	BGA2; μPGA2	September 16, 2002	$401
Mobile Pentium III-M 1333	1333 MHz	512 KB	133 MT/s	10×	1.15–1.4 V	22 W	BGA2; μPGA2	September 16, 2002	$508
Mobile Pentium III-M LV 733	733 MHz	512 KB	133 MT/s	5.5×	1.05–1.15 V	9.3 W	BGA2	October 1, 2001	$241
Mobile Pentium III-M LV 750	750 MHz	512 KB	100 MT/s	7.5×	1.05–1.15 V	9.4 W	BGA2	October 1, 2001	$241
Mobile Pentium III-M LV 800	800 MHz	512 KB	133 MT/s	6×	1.05–1.15 V	9.4 W	BGA2	October 1, 2001	$316
Mobile Pentium III-M LV 800A	800 MHz	512 KB	133 MT/s	6×	1.05–1.15 V	9.4 W	BGA2	October 1, 2001	$316
Mobile Pentium III-M LV 850	850 MHz	512 KB	100 MT/s	8.5×	1.05–1.15 V	10 W	BGA2	January 21, 2002	$316
Mobile Pentium III-M LV 866	867 MHz	512 KB	133 MT/s	6.5×	1.05–1.15 V	10.1 W	BGA2	January 21, 2002	$316
Mobile Pentium III-M LV 933	933 MHz	512 KB	133 MT/s	7×	1.05–1.15 V	10.5 W	BGA2	April 17, 2002	$316
Mobile Pentium III-M LV 1000	1000 MHz	512 KB	133 MT/s	7.5×	1.05–1.15 V	11 W	BGA2	September 16, 2002	$316
Mobile Pentium III-M ULV 700	700 MHz	512 KB	100 MT/s	7×	0.95–1.1 V	7 W	BGA2	October 1, 2001	$209
Mobile Pentium III-M ULV 733	733 MHz	512 KB	133 MT/s	5.5×	0.95–1.1 V	7 W	BGA2		
Mobile Pentium III-M ULV 750	750 MHz	512 KB	100 MT/s	7.5×	0.95–1.1 V	7 W	BGA2	January 21, 2002	$209
Mobile Pentium III-M ULV 800	800 MHz	512 KB	133 MT/s	6×	0.95–1.1 V	9.8 W	BGA2	April 17, 2002	$209
Mobile Pentium III-M ULV 800A	800 MHz	512 KB	133 MT/s	6×	0.95–1.1 V	9.8 W	BGA2	April 17, 2002	$209
Mobile Pentium III-M ULV 850	850 MHz	512 KB	100 MT/s	8.5×	0.95–1.1 V	9.8 W	BGA2	September 16, 2002	$209
Mobile Pentium III-M ULV 866	867 MHz	512 KB	133 MT/s	6.5×	0.95–1.1 V	9.8 W	BGA2	September 16, 2002	$209
Mobile Pentium III-M ULV 900	900 MHz	512 KB	100 MT/s	9×	0.95–1.1 V	9.8 W	BGA2	January 14, 2003	$209
Mobile Pentium III-M ULV 933	933 MHz	512 KB	133 MT/s	7×	0.95–1.1 V	9.8 W	BGA2	January 14, 2003	$209

== Videogame consoles ==
=== "Coppermine-128" (180 nm) ===
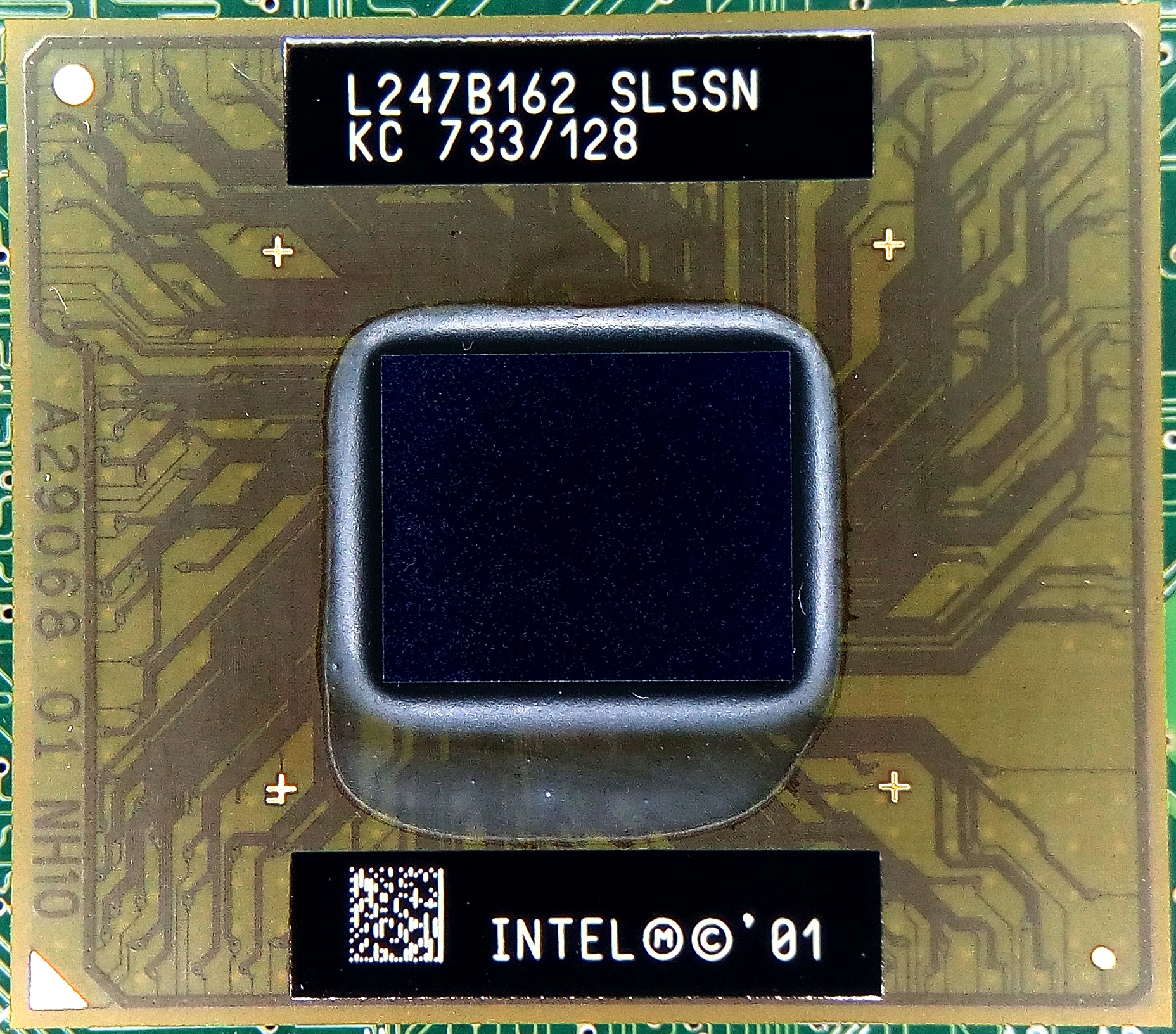
Xbox's Coppermine CPU

A custom Coppermine-based Pentium III version was developed for Microsoft's Xbox game console. The only significant change was that the chip lost half of its L2 cache, dropping it down to 128 KB. Unlike the Celeron Coppermine-128 variant with the same size L2 cache, but reduced 4-way L2 cache associativity, Xbox's Coppermine core kept all of its 8-way L2 cache associativity from the Pentium III. This means that the Xbox CPU's L2 cache is more efficient than Celeron's. The Xbox CPU was manufactured onto the same Micro-PGA2 packaging as notebook chips, but in a BGA (ball grid array) format.

- All models support: MMX, SSE
- The L2 cache runs at 100% cpu speed

Model	Clock rate	L2 cache	FSB	Mult.	Voltage	TDP	Socket	Release date	Release price (USD)
Intel Pentium III KC 733 (Xbox CPU)	733 MHz	128 KB	133 MT/s	5.5×	?–1.7 V	? W	Socket 495 BGA2	June 19, 2000	-

== See also ==
- List of Intel Pentium processors
