= ABIT BP6 =

ATX motherboard released by ABIT in 1999

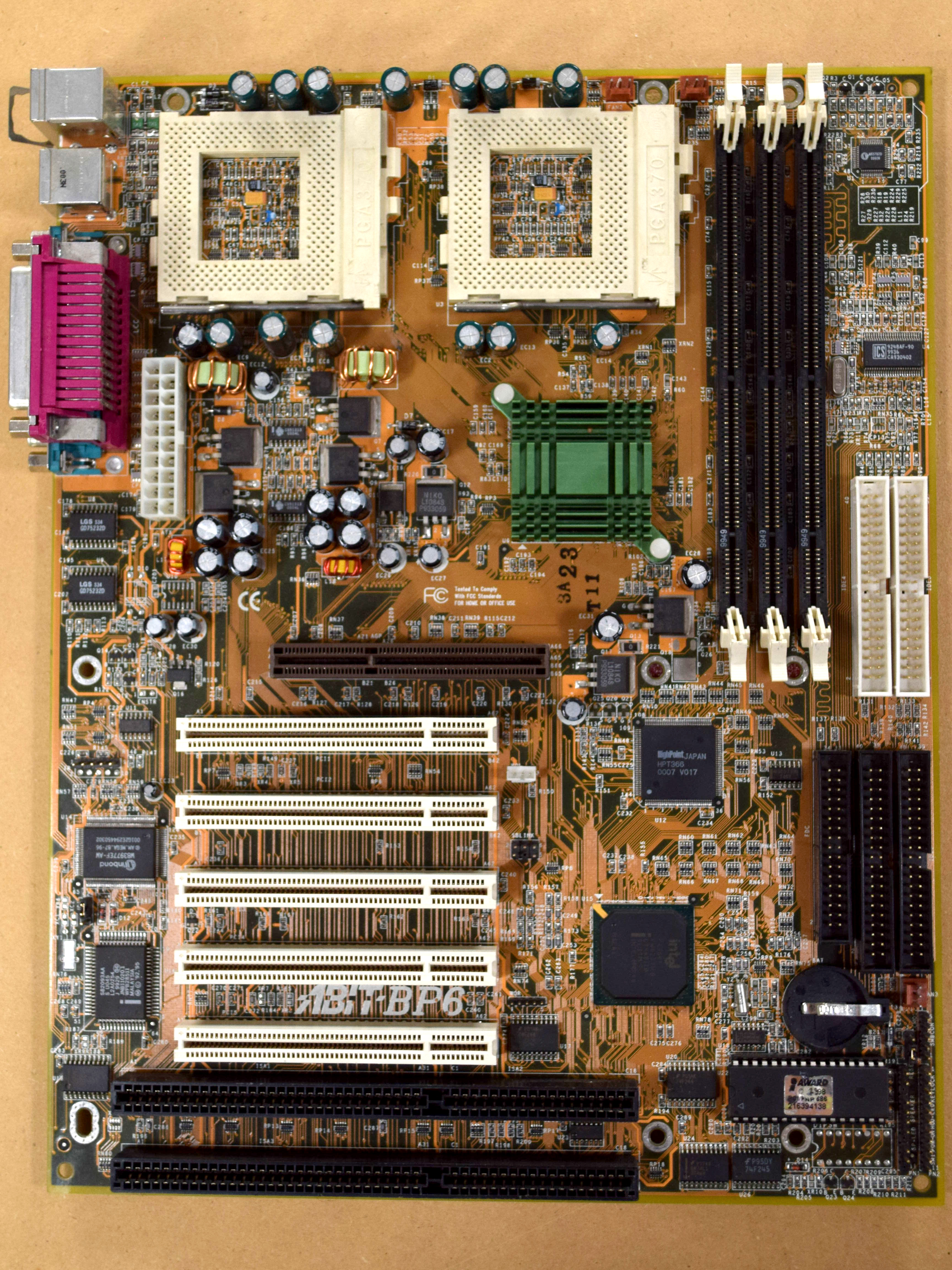
- ABIT BP6 with unpopulated processor sockets
- Manufacturer: ABIT Computer Corporation
- Type: Motherboard (ATX)
- Released: 28 June 1999; 27 years ago
- CPU: Celeron processors (PPGA Socket 370), 300–533 MHz
- Memory: Up to 768 MB SDRAM DIMMs
- Connectivity: Buses: AGP 2x; PCI; ISA; Ports: USB 1.1; RS-232; Parallel port; PS/2 port
- Website: abit.com.tw at the Wayback Machine (archived 1999-10-03)

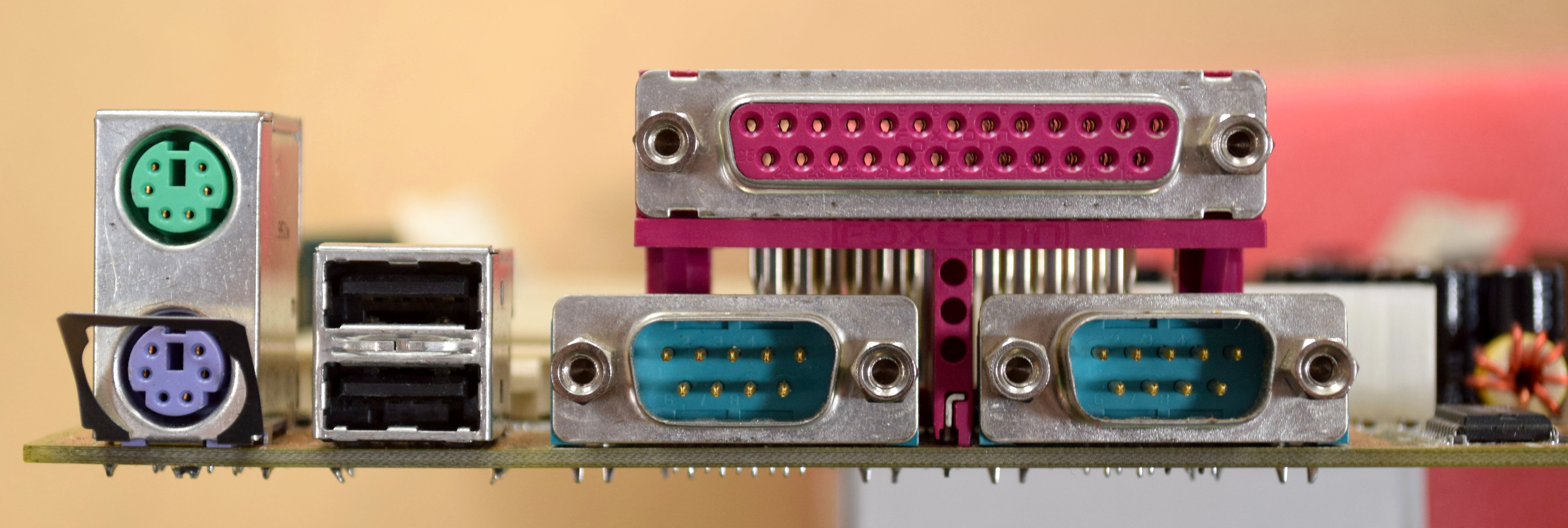
ABIT BP6 PC-99 colored peripheral connectors

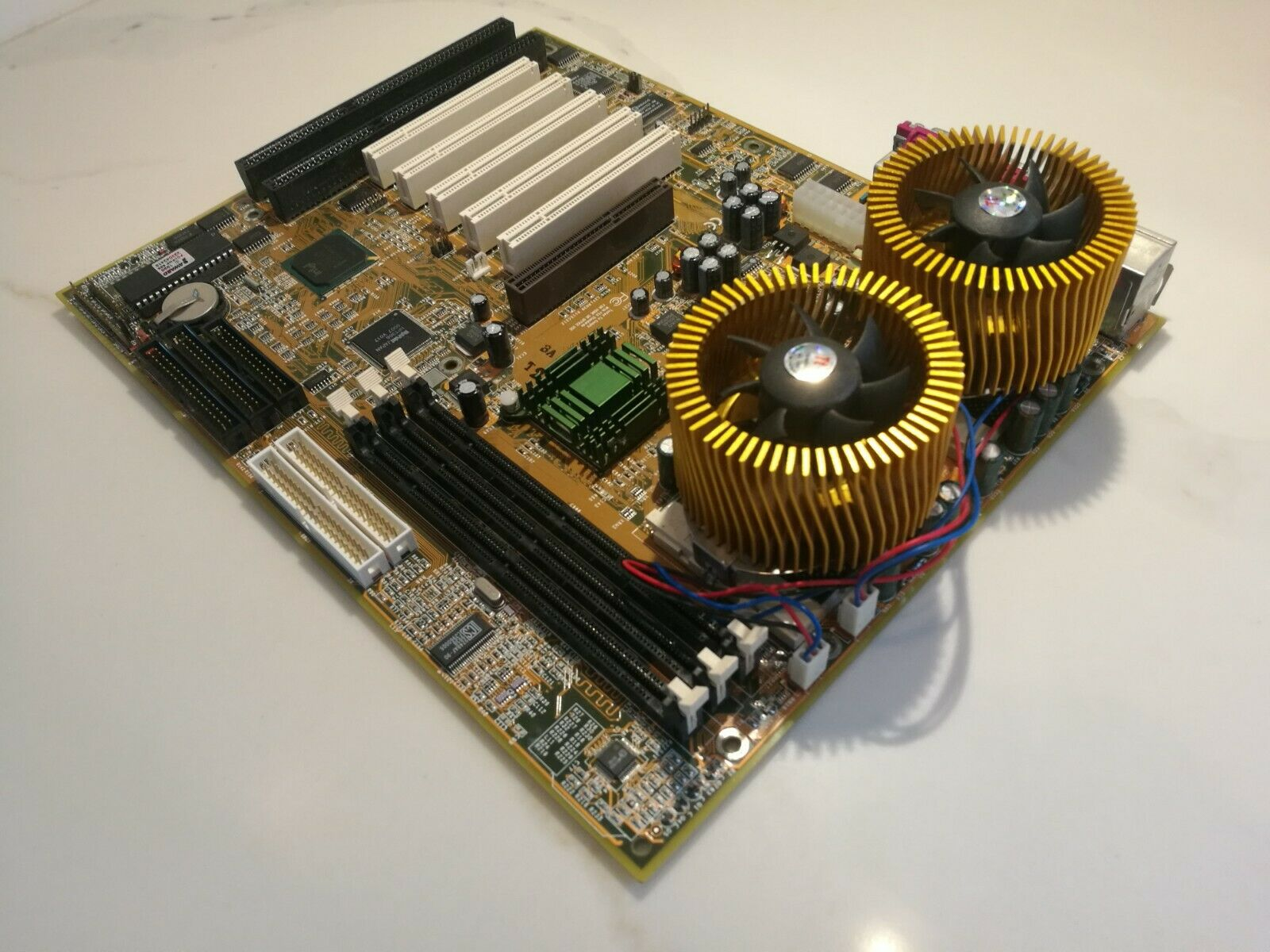
ABIT BP6 with CPUs and heat sinks

The ABIT BP6 is an ATX motherboard released by ABIT in 1999. It was the first motherboard to allow the use of two unmodified Intel Celeron processors in dual symmetric multiprocessing (SMP) configuration. This combined with its overclocking capabilities made it a popular option among computer enthusiasts. The BP6 has been credited as the product that made multi-processor systems affordable for mainstream users, because prior to its release the expense of any multi-processor configuration made it a feature only to be considered for workstation-class systems.

The BP6 was based on the Intel Seattle 440BX chipset, consisting of the 82443BX Northbridge and the 82371EB Southbridge.

Processors that are supported by the BP6 in SMP configuration are the PPGA Socket 370 Celeron processors (300–533 MHz). Later Pentium III and Celeron Coppermine models can also operate on the BP6, albeit only in single processor configuration with the use of aftermarket socket adaptors. Intel never intended the Celeron to be able to operate in SMP, and later-generation Celeron processors had their SMP interface disabled, restricting the feature to the higher-end Pentium III and Xeon product lines.

The motherboard also features two extra HDD ports, one with the HPT366 Ultra DMA/66 adapter fitted on the mainboard itself. This allows up to eight IDE compatible drives to operate at the interface's maximum speed.

The motherboard features the ABIT SoftMenu, a BIOS extension which allows for jumper-less adjustment of system parameters such as system bus speed, CPU & AGP bridge multipliers, voltages from inside the BIOS and PC-99 coloring.

The BP6, and many other of ABIT's motherboards produced between 1999 and 2005, were victims of the capacitor plague.

Specification
CPU socket	2× Socket 370
Chipset	i440 BX
Expansion cards	1× AGP 2x, 5× PCI and 2× ISA (1 PCI-ISA shared)
RAM	3× DIMM slots, maximum 768 MB SDRAM
IDE support	4× Ultra ATA/66, 4× Ultra ATA/33 devices
Peripheral	2× USB 1.1, 2× RS-232, 1× Parallel port, 2× PS/2 port
