= Intel P3 =

Intel P3 may refer to:

- Intel Pentium III, a 6th generation Intel CPU design
- Intel 80386, a 3rd generation Intel processor design
