= Socket 495 =

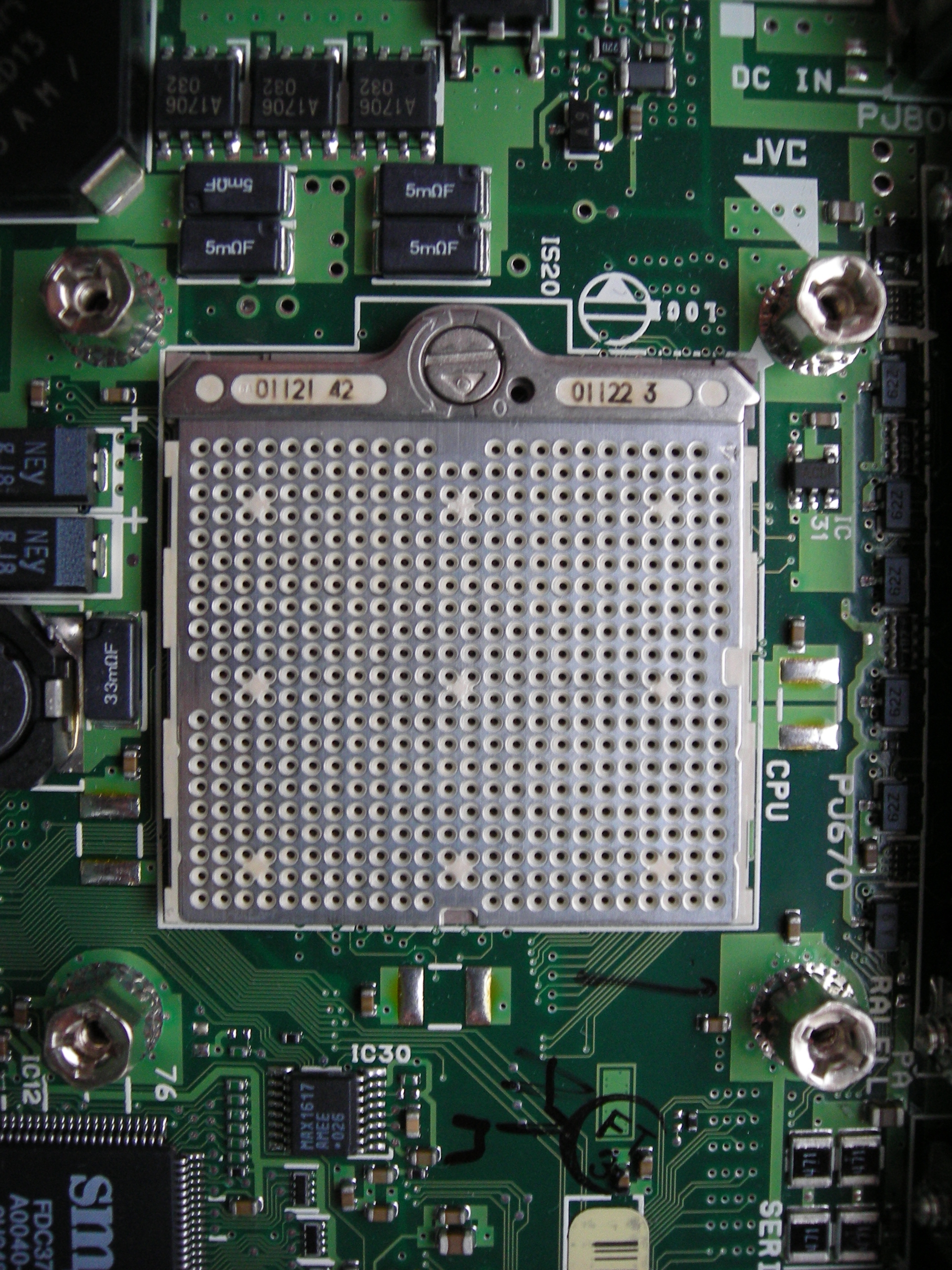
- Type: PGA-ZIF
- Chip form factors: Flip-chip pin grid array (FC-PGA2)
- Contacts: 495
- FSB protocol: AGTL+
- Voltage range: 1.6-1.7V
- Processors: Intel Pentium III; Intel Celeron
- Predecessor: Socket 615
- Successor: Socket 479
- This article is part of the CPU socket series

Socket 495, also known as μPGA2, is a CPU socket used for the Intel Pentium III and Celeron mobile processors. This socket was also used in Microsoft's Xbox console for the Xbox CPU, albeit in a BGA (ball grid array) format. It replaces Socket 615 (μPGA1), which was used in Pentium II and early Celeron mobile processors.

== Technical specifications ==
This socket is a 495 pin CPU socket designed to house any processor in the Socket 495 package. The socket has a 1.27mm pitch and is designed to support a heatsink.

== See also ==
- List of Intel processors
- List of Intel Celeron processors
