= Pentium III =

Line of desktop and mobile microprocessors produced by Intel

General information
- Launched: February 28, 1999
- Discontinued: April 23, 2004 (for desktop units); May 18, 2007 (for mobile units)
- Marketed by: Intel
- Designed by: Intel
- Common manufacturer: Intel
- Product code: Katmai: 80525; Coppermine: 80526; Coppermine T: 80533; Tualatin: 80530

Performance
- Max. CPU clock rate: 400 MHz to 1.4 GHz
- FSB speeds: 100 MT/s to 133 MT/s

Physical specifications
- Transistors: Katmai: 9.5 million; Coppermine: 28 million; Tualatin: 47 million
- Cores: 1
- Sockets: Slot 1; Socket 370; Socket 495 (mobile); Socket 479 (mobile)

Cache
- L1 cache: 32 KB (16 KB data + 16 KB instructions)
- L2 cache: 128–512 KB

Architecture and classification
- Technology node: 250 nm to 130 nm
- Microarchitecture: P6
- Instruction set: IA-32
- Extensions: MMX, SSE

Products, models, variants
- Core names: Katmai (desktop only); Coppermine; Coppermine T (desktop only); Tualatin
- Variant: Celeron

History
- Predecessor: Pentium II
- Successor: Pentium 4

Support status
- Unsupported

The Pentium III (informally the PIII or P3) is a brand of 32-bit microprocessors designed and marketed by Intel. Based on the x86 instruction set architecture and the P6 microarchitecture, the Pentium III is intended to be used as CPUs in both personal computers and servers. It was first introduced on February 28, 1999.

The brand's initial processors were very similar to the earlier Pentium II-branded processors. The most notable differences were the addition of the Streaming SIMD Extensions (SSE) instruction set (to accelerate floating point and parallel calculations), and the introduction of a controversial serial number embedded in the chip during manufacturing (absent on Tualatin and later Intel processors).

Even after the release of the Pentium 4 in late 2000, the Pentium III continued to be produced with new models introduced up until early 2003, and were discontinued in April 2004 for desktop units and May 2007 for mobile units.

== Processor cores ==
Similarly to the Pentium II it superseded, the Pentium III was also accompanied by the Celeron brand for lower-end versions, and the Xeon for high-end (server and workstation) derivatives. The Pentium III was eventually superseded by the Pentium 4, but its Tualatin core also served as the basis for the Pentium M CPUs, which used many ideas from the P6 microarchitecture. Subsequently, it was the Pentium M microarchitecture of Pentium M branded CPUs, and not the NetBurst found in Pentium 4 processors, that formed the basis for Intel's energy-efficient Core microarchitecture of CPUs branded Core 2, Pentium Dual-Core, Celeron (Core), and Xeon.

Intel Pentium III processor family
Standard logo (1999–2003)	Desktop			Mobile logo (2001–2003)	Mobile		
Standard logo (1999–2003)	Code-named	Node	Date released	Mobile logo (2001–2003)	Code-named	Node	Date released
Pentium III logo (1999–2003)	Katmai; Coppermine; Coppermine T Tualatin	250 nm 180 nm 180 nm 130 nm	February 1999; October 1999; June 2001; June 2001	Pentium III-M Logo (1999–2003)	Coppermine; Tualatin	180 nm 130 nm	October 1999; July 2001
List of desktop processors				List of mobile processors			

=== Katmai ===
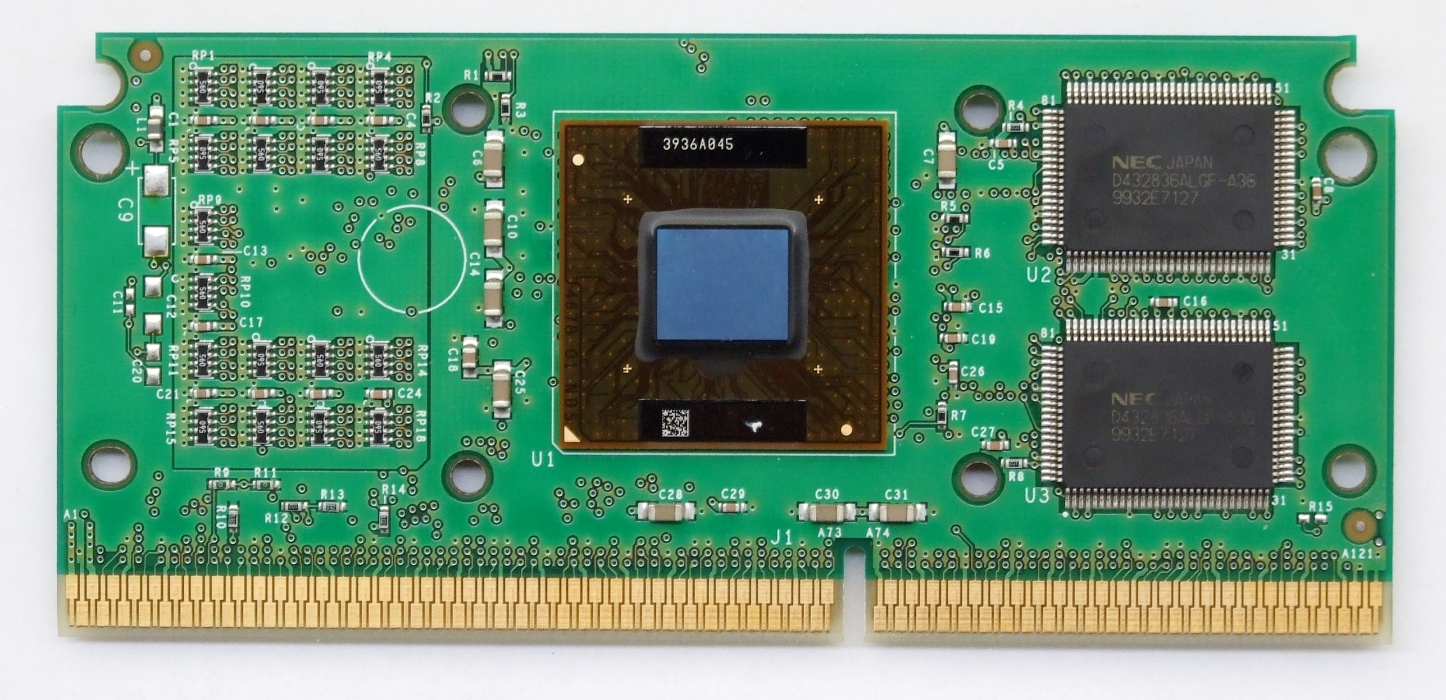
A Pentium III Katmai SECC2 cartridge with heatsink removed

Katmai die shot

The first Pentium III variant was the Katmai (Intel product code 80525). It was a further development of the Deschutes Pentium II. The Pentium III saw an increase of 2 million transistors over the Pentium II. The differences were the addition of execution units and SSE instruction support, and an improved L1 cache controller (the L2 cache controller was left unchanged, as it would be fully redesigned for Coppermine anyway), which were responsible for the minor performance improvements over the "Deschutes" Pentium IIs. It was first released at speeds of 450 and 500 MHz on February 28, 1999. Two more versions were released: 550 MHz on May 17, 1999, and 600 MHz on August 2, 1999. On September 27, 1999, Intel released the 533B and 600B running at 533 & 600 MHz respectively. The 'B' suffix indicated that it featured a 133 MT/s FSB, instead of the 100 MT/s FSB of prior models.

The Katmai contains 9.5 million transistors, not including the 512 Kbytes L2 cache (which adds 25 million transistors), and has dimensions of 12.3 mm by 10.4 mm (128 mm^{2}). It is fabricated in Intel's P856.5 process, a 250 nm complementary metal–oxide–semiconductor (CMOS) process with five levels of aluminum interconnect. The Katmai used the same slot-based design as the Pentium II but with the newer Slot 1 Single Edge Contact Cartridge (SECC) 2 that allowed direct CPU core contact with the heat sink. There have been some early models of the Pentium III with 450 and 500 MHz packaged in an older SECC cartridge intended for original equipment manufacturers (OEMs).

A notable stepping level for enthusiasts was SL35D. This version of Katmai was officially rated for 450 MHz, but often contained cache chips for the 600 MHz model and thus usually can run at 600 MHz.

=== Coppermine ===
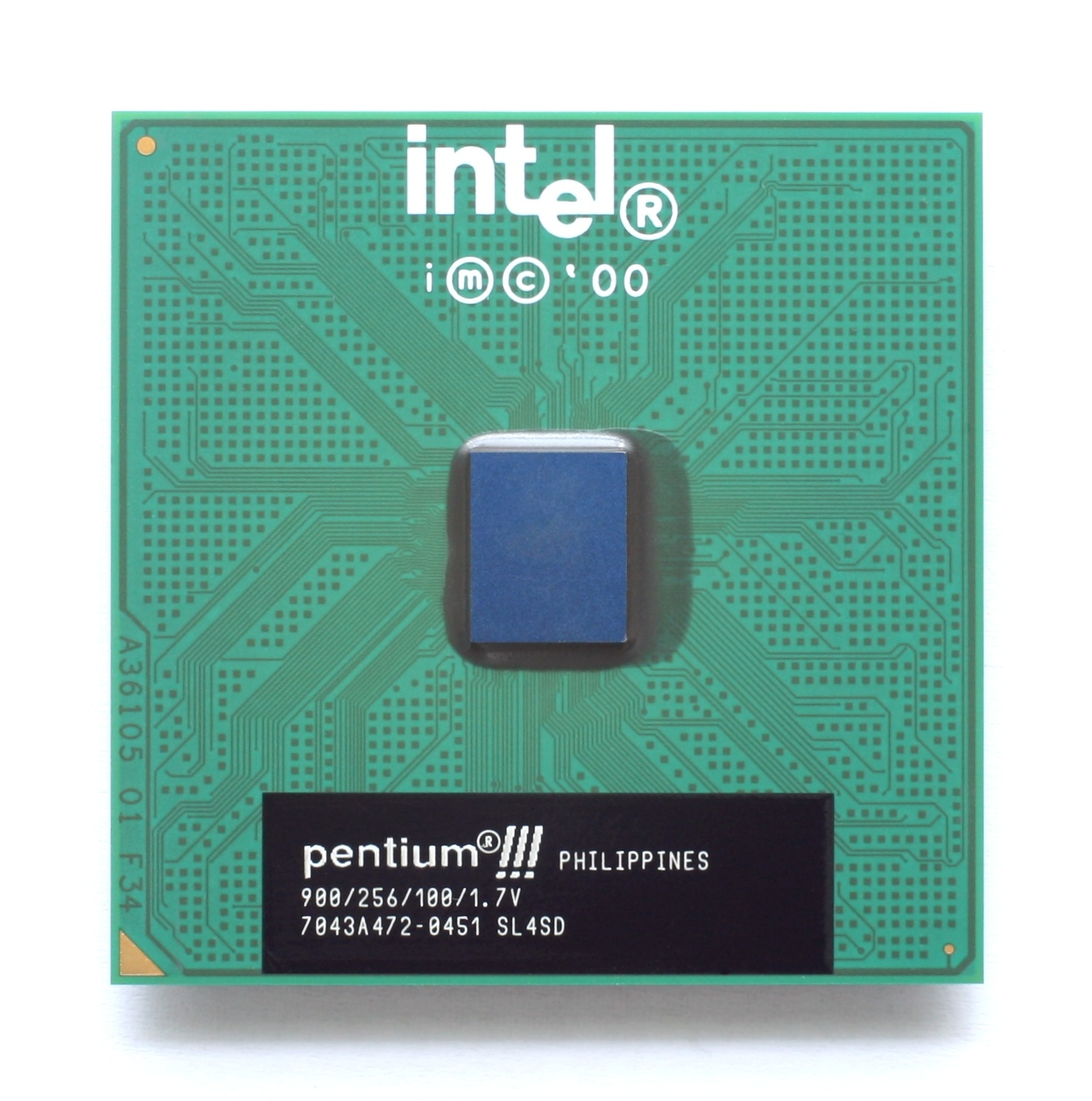
A 900 MHz Coppermine FC-PGA Pentium III

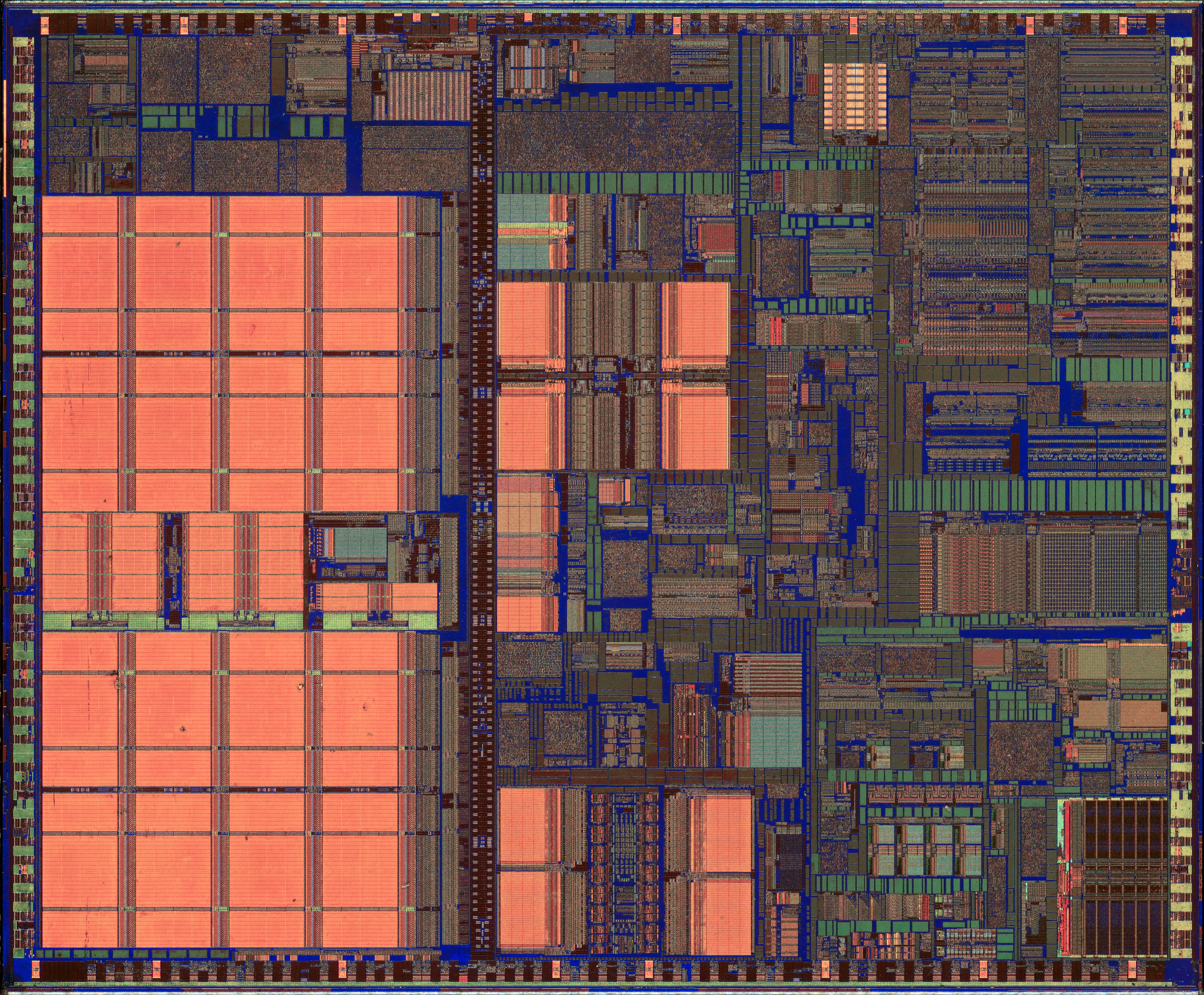
Coppermine die shot

The second version, codenamed Coppermine (Intel product code: 80526), was released on October 25, 1999, running at 500, 533, 550, 600, 650, 667, 700, and 733 MHz. From December 1999 to May 2000, Intel released Pentium IIIs running at speeds of 750, 800, 850, 866, 900, 933 and 1000 MHz (1 GHz). Both 100 MT/s FSB and 133 MT/s FSB models were made. For models that were already available with the same frequency, an "E" was appended to the model name to indicate cores using the new 180 nm fabrication process. An additional "B" was later appended to designate 133 MHz FSB models, resulting in an "EB" suffix. In overall performance, Coppermine had a small advantage over the Advanced Micro Devices (AMD) Athlons it was released against, which was reversed when AMD applied their own die shrink and added an on-die L2 cache to the Athlon. Athlon held the advantage in floating-point intensive code, while the Coppermine could perform better when SSE optimizations were used, but in practical terms there was little difference in how the two chips performed, clock-for-clock. However, AMD were able to clock the Athlon higher, reaching speeds of 1.2 GHz before the launch of the Pentium 4.

In performance, Coppermine arguably marked a bigger step than Katmai by introducing an on-chip L2 cache, which Intel names Advanced Transfer Cache (ATC). The ATC operates at the core clock rate and has a capacity of 256 KB, twice that of the on-chip cache formerly on Mendocino Celerons. It is eight-way set-associative and is accessed via a Double Quad Word Wide 256-bit bus, four times as wide as Katmai's. Further, latency was dropped to a quarter compared to Katmai. Another marketing term by Intel was Advanced System Buffering, which encompassed improvements to better take advantage of a 133 MT/s system bus. These include 6 fill buffers (vs. 4 on Katmai), 8 bus queue entries (vs. 4 on Katmai) and 4 write-back buffers (vs. 1 on Katmai). Under competitive pressure from the AMD Athlon, Intel reworked the internals, finally removing some well-known pipeline stalls. As a result, applications affected by the stalls ran faster on Coppermine by up to 30%. The Coppermine contained 29 million transistors and was fabricated in a 180 nm process.

The Coppermine was available in 370-pin FC-PGA or FC-PGA2 for use with Socket 370, or in SECC2 for Slot 1 (all speeds except 900 and 1100). FC-PGA and Slot 1 Coppermine CPUs have an exposed die, however most higher frequency SKUs starting with the 866 MHz model were also produced in FC-PGA2 variants that feature an integrated heat spreader (IHS). This in itself did not improve thermal conductivity, since it added another layer of metal and thermal paste between the die and the heatsink, but it greatly assisted in holding the heatsink flat against the die. Earlier Coppermines without the IHS made heatsink mounting challenging. If the heatsink was not situated flat against the die, heat transfer efficiency was greatly reduced. Some heatsink manufacturers began providing pads on their products, similar to what AMD did with the "Thunderbird" Athlon to ensure that the heatsink was mounted flatly. The enthusiast community went so far as to create shims to assist in maintaining a flat interface.

A 1.13 GHz version (S-Spec SL4HH) was released in mid-2000 but famously recalled after a collaboration between HardOCP and Tom's Hardware discovered various instabilities with the operation of the new CPU speed grade. The Coppermine core was unable to reliably reach the 1.13 GHz speed without various tweaks to the processor's microcode, effective cooling, higher voltage (1.75 V vs. 1.65 V), and specifically validated platforms. Intel only officially supported the processor on its own VC820 i820-based motherboard, but even this motherboard displayed instability in the independent tests of the hardware review sites. In benchmarks that were stable, performance was shown to be sub-par, with the 1.13 GHz CPU equalling a 1.0 GHz model. Tom's Hardware attributed this performance deficit to relaxed tuning of the CPU and motherboard to improve stability. Intel needed at least six months to resolve the problems using a new cD0 stepping and re-released 1.1 GHz and 1.13 GHz versions in 2001.

Microsoft's Xbox game console uses a variant of the Pentium III/Mobile Celeron family in a Micro-PGA2 form factor. The sSpec designator of the chips is SL5Sx, which makes it more similar to the Mobile Celeron Coppermine-128 processor. It shares with the Coppermine-128 Celeron its 128 KB L2 cache, and 180 nm process technology, but keeps the 8-way cache associativity from the Pentium III.

Although its codename could give the impression that it used copper interconnects, in reality, its interconnects were aluminium.

=== Coppermine T ===
This revision is an intermediate step between Coppermine and Tualatin, with support for lower-voltage system logic present on the latter but core power within previously defined voltage specs of the former so it could work in older system boards.

Intel used the latest FC-PGA2 Coppermines with the cD0 stepping and modified them so that they worked with low voltage system bus operation at 1.25 V AGTL as well as normal 1.5 V AGTL+ signal levels, and would auto detect differential or single-ended clocking. This modification made them compatible to the latest generation Socket 370 boards supporting Tualatin CPUs while maintaining compatibility with older Socket 370 boards. The Coppermine T also had two way symmetrical multiprocessing capabilities, but only in Tualatin boards.

They can be distinguished from Tualatin processors by their part numbers, which include the digits "80533", e.g. the 1133 MHz SL5QK P/N is RK80533PZ006256, while the 1000 MHz SL5QJ P/N is RK80533PZ001256.

=== Tualatin ===
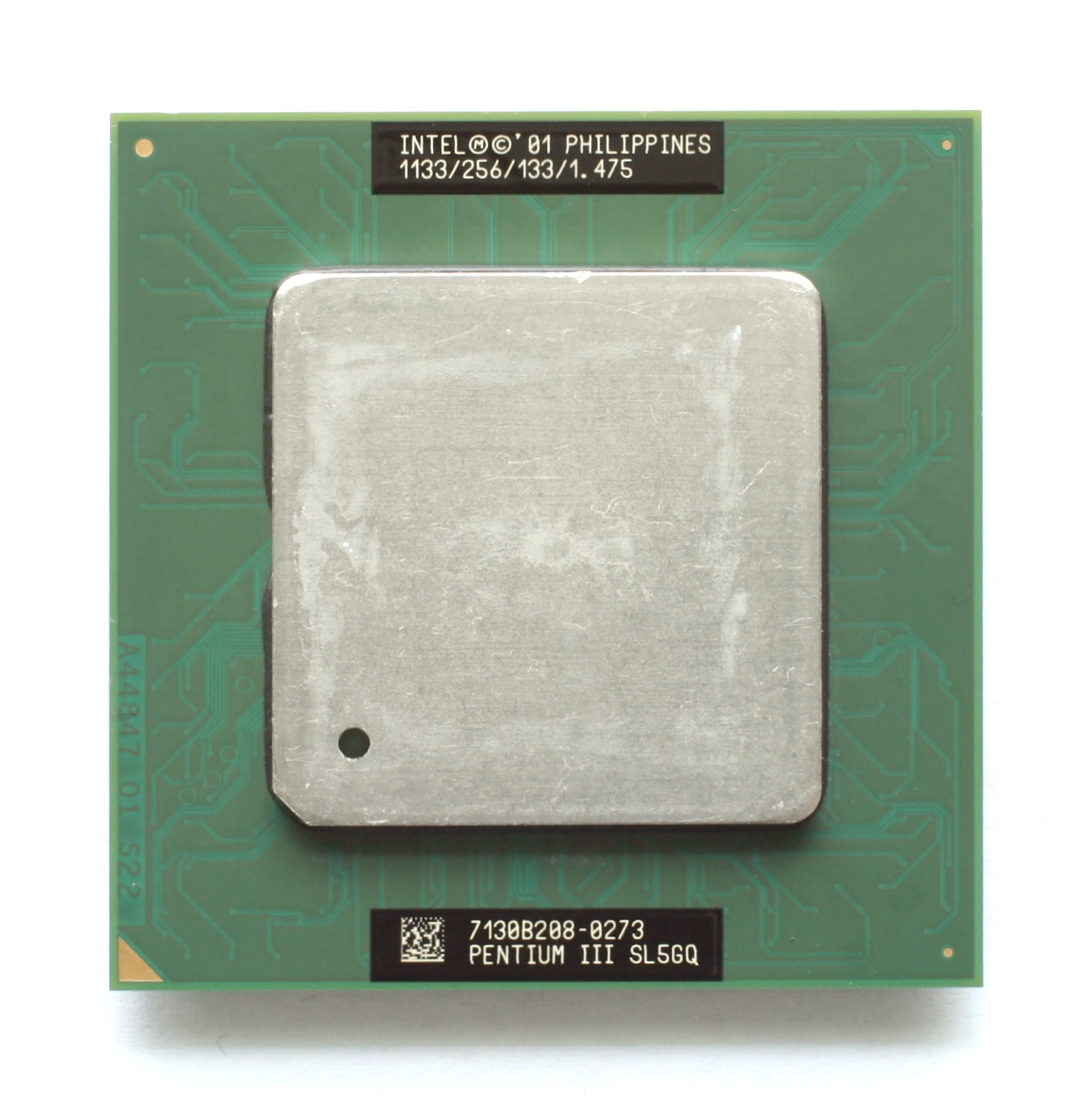
A 1.13 GHz FC-PGA2 Tualatin-256 Intel Pentium III-T

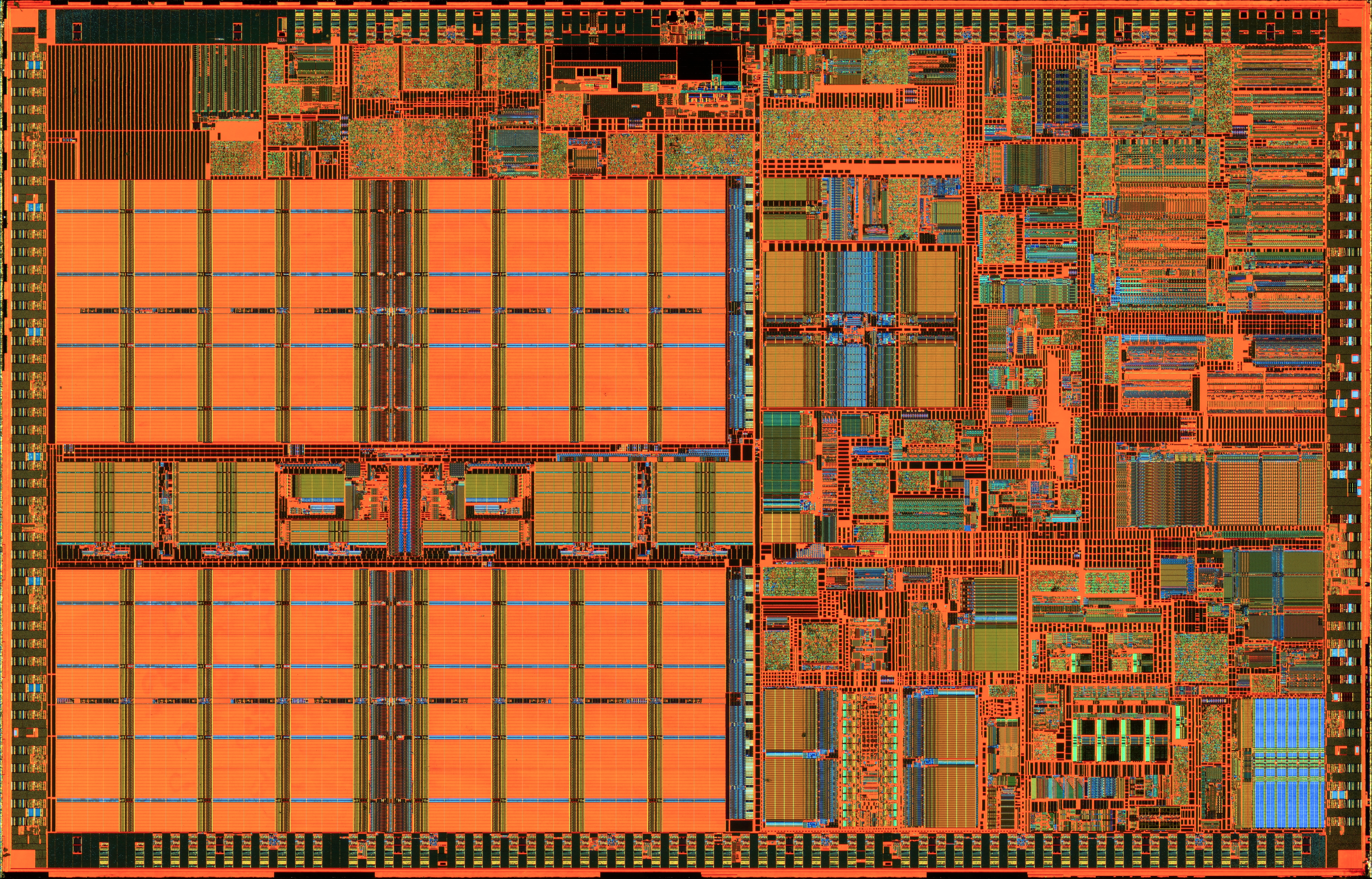
Tualatin die shot

The third revision, Tualatin (80530), was a trial for Intel's new 130 nm process. Tualatin-based Pentium IIIs were released during 2001 until early 2002 at speeds of 1.0, 1.13, 1.2, 1.26, 1.33 and 1.4 GHz. A basic shrink of Coppermine, no new features were added, except for added data prefetch logic similar to Pentium 4 and Athlon XP for potentially better use of the L2 cache, although its use compared to these newer CPUs is limited due to the relatively smaller FSB bandwidth (FSB was still kept at 133 MHz). Variants with 256 and 512 KB L2 cache were produced, the latter being dubbed Pentium III-S; this variant was mainly intended for low-power consumption servers and also exclusively featured SMP support within the Tualatin line.

Although the Socket 370 designation was kept, the use of 1.25 V AGTL signaling in place of 1.5 V AGTL+ rendered prior motherboards incompatible. This confusion carried over to the chipset naming, where only the B-stepping of the i815 chipset was compatible with Tualatin processors. A new VRM guideline was also designed by Intel, version 8.5, which required finer voltage steps and debuted load line Vcore (in place of fixed voltage regardless of current on 8.4). Some motherboard manufacturers would mark the change with blue sockets (instead of white), and were often also backwards compatible with Coppermine CPUs.

The Tualatin also formed the basis for the highly popular Pentium III-M mobile processor, which became Intel's front-line mobile chip (the Pentium 4 drew significantly more power, and so was not well-suited for this role) for the next two years, and further the Pentium M processor. The chip offered a good balance between power consumption and performance, thus finding a place in both performance notebooks and the "thin and light" category.

The Tualatin-based Pentium III performed well in some applications compared to the fastest Willamette-based Pentium 4, and even the Thunderbird-based Athlons. Despite this, its appeal was limited due to the aforementioned incompatibility with existing systems, and Intel's only officially supported chipset for Tualatins, the i815, could only handle 512 MB RAM as opposed to 1 GB of registered RAM with the older, incompatible 440BX chipset. However, the enthusiast community found a way to run Tualatins on then-ubiquitous BX chipset based boards, although it was often a non-trivial task and required some degree of technical skills.

Tualatin-based Pentium III CPUs can usually be visually distinguished from Coppermine-based processors by the metal integrated heat-spreader (IHS) fixed on top of the package. However, the last models of Coppermine Pentium IIIs also featured the IHS — the integrated heat spreader is actually what distinguishes the FC-PGA2 package from the FC-PGA — both are for Socket 370 motherboards.

Before the addition of the heat spreader, it was sometimes difficult to install a heatsink on a Pentium III. One had to be careful not to put force on the core at an angle because doing so would cause the edges and corners of the core to crack and could destroy the CPU. It was also sometimes difficult to achieve a flat mating of the CPU and heatsink surfaces, a factor of critical importance to good heat transfer. This became increasingly challenging with the Socket 370 CPUs, compared with their Slot 1 predecessors, because of the force required to mount a socket-based cooler and the narrower, 2-sided mounting mechanism (Slot 1 featured 4-point mounting). As such, and because the 130 nm Tualatin had an even smaller core surface area than the 180 nm Coppermine, Intel installed the metal heatspreader on Tualatin and all future desktop processors.

The Tualatin core was named after the Tualatin Valley and Tualatin River in Oregon, where Intel has large manufacturing and design facilities.

== New features ==
=== Streaming SIMD Extensions ===
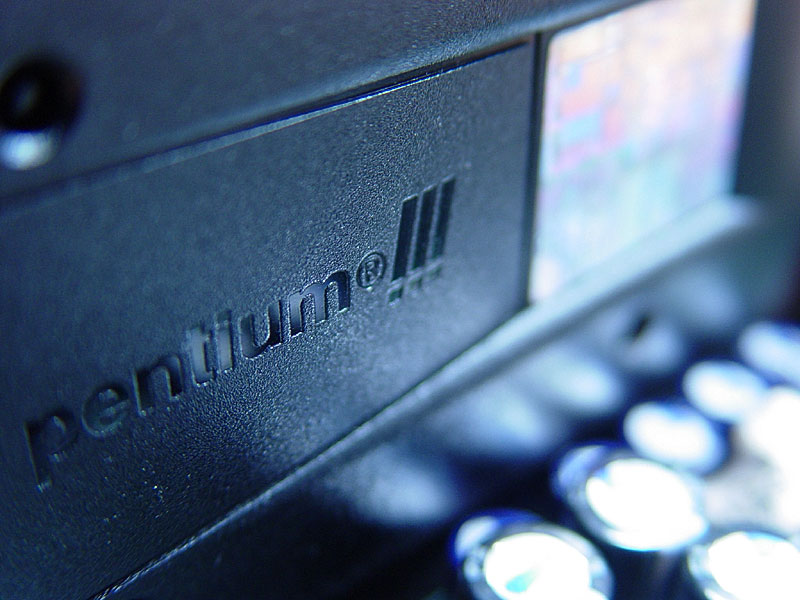
Slot 1 Pentium III CPU mounted on a motherboard

Since Katmai was built in the same 250 nm process as Pentium II "Deschutes", it had to implement Streaming SIMD Extensions (SSE) using minimal silicon. To achieve this goal, Intel implemented the 128-bit architecture by double-cycling the existing 64-bit data paths and by merging the SIMD-FP multiplier unit with the x87 scalar FPU multiplier into a single unit. To utilize the existing 64-bit data paths, Katmai issues each SIMD-FP instruction as two μops. To compensate partially for implementing only half of SSE's architectural width, Katmai implements the SIMD-FP adder as a separate unit on the second dispatch port. This organization allows one half of a SIMD multiply and one half of an independent SIMD add to be issued together bringing the peak throughput back to four floating point operations per cycle — at least for code with an even distribution of multiplies and adds.

The issue was that Katmai's hardware-implementation contradicted the parallelism model implied by the SSE instruction-set. Programmers faced a code-scheduling dilemma: "Should the SSE-code be tuned for Katmai's limited execution resources, or should it be tuned for a future processor with more resources?" Katmai-specific SSE optimizations yielded the best possible performance from the Pentium III family but was suboptimal for Coppermine onwards as well as future Intel processors, such as the Pentium 4 and Core series.

=== Processor serial number ===
The Pentium III was the first x86 CPU to include a unique, retrievable identification number called Processor Serial Number (PSN). A Pentium III's PSN can be read by software through the CPUID instruction if this feature has not been disabled through the BIOS.

On November 29, 1999, the Science and Technology Options Assessment (STOA) Panel of the European Parliament, following their report on electronic surveillance techniques asked parliamentary committee members to consider legal measures that would "prevent these chips from being installed in the computers of European citizens." PSN was eventually dropped on Tualatin-based Pentium IIIs, and the feature was absent in Pentium 4 and Pentium M.

A largely equivalent feature, the Protected Processor Identification Number (PPIN) was later added to x86 CPUs with little public notice, starting with Intel's Ivy Bridge architecture and compatible Zen 2 AMD CPUs. It is implemented as a set of model-specific registers and is useful for machine check exception handling.

== Core specifications ==
Code- name	First Re- lease	Pro- cess size	Cache		Instruc- tions	Package	VCore (V)	Clock Rate (MHz)	Front side bus (MT/s)
Code- name	First Re- lease	Pro- cess size	L1 (data + instr.)	L2	Instruc- tions	Package	VCore (V)	Clock Rate (MHz)	Front side bus (MT/s)
Katmai	Feb 26 1999	250 nm	16+16 KB	512 KB, half speed	MMX, SSE	Slot 1 (SECC, SECC2)	2.00 (<600 MHz); 2.05 (600 MHz)	450, 500, 550, 600 (450, 500, 550, 600)	100
Katmai	Feb 26 1999	250 nm	16+16 KB	512 KB, half speed	MMX, SSE	Slot 1 (SECC, SECC2)	2.00 (<600 MHz); 2.05 (600 MHz)	533, 600 (533B, 600B)	133
Copper- mine	Oct 25 1999	180 nm	16+16 KB	256 KB, full speed	MMX, SSE	Slot 1 (SECC2), Socket 370 (FC-PGA, FC-PGA2)	1.60,1.65, 1.70,1.75	500,550,600,650,700,750, 800,850,900,1000,1100 (E-Models)	100
Copper- mine	Oct 25 1999	180 nm	16+16 KB	256 KB, full speed	MMX, SSE	Slot 1 (SECC2), Socket 370 (FC-PGA, FC-PGA2)	1.60,1.65, 1.70,1.75	533,600,667,733,800,866, 933,1000,1133 (EB-Models)	133
Copper- mine T	June; 2001	180 nm	16+16 KB	256 KB, full speed	MMX, SSE	Socket 370 (FC-PGA2)	1.75	800, 866, 933, 1000, 1133	133
Tualatin	June; 2001	130 nm	16+16 KB	256 KB, full speed	MMX, SSE, Hardware; Prefetch	Socket 370 (FC-PGA2)	1.45/1.475	1000,1100,1200,1300,1400 (Celeron)	100
Tualatin	June; 2001	130 nm	16+16 KB	256 KB, full speed	MMX, SSE, Hardware; Prefetch	Socket 370 (FC-PGA2)	1.45/1.475	1000,1133,1200,1333,1400 (Pentium III)	133
Tualatin	June; 2001	130 nm	16+16 KB	512 KB, full speed	MMX, SSE, Hardware; Prefetch	Socket 370 (FC-PGA2)	1.45/1.475	1133, 1266, 1400 (Pentium III-S)	133
List of Intel Pentium III processors

Size comparison of Pentium III dies

== See also ==
- List of Intel Pentium III processors
- List of Intel Celeron processors

Preceded by Pentium II	Pentium III; 1999–2003	Succeeded by Pentium 4 (desktop); Pentium M (mobile)
