= Comparison of Intel processors =

As of 2020, the x86 architecture is used in most high end compute-intensive computers, including cloud computing, servers, workstations, and many less powerful computers, including personal computer desktops and laptops. The ARM architecture is used in most other product categories, especially high-volume battery powered mobile devices such as smartphones and tablet computers.

Some Xeon Phi processors support four-way hyper-threading, effectively quadrupling the number of threads. Before the Coffee Lake architecture, most Xeon and all desktop and mobile Core i3 and i7 supported hyper-threading while only dual-core mobile i5's supported it. Post Coffee Lake, increased core counts meant hyper-threading is not needed for Core i3, as it then replaced the i5 with four physical cores on the desktop platform. Core i7, on the desktop platform no longer supports hyper-threading; instead, now higher-performing core i9s will support hyper-threading on both mobile and desktop platforms. Before 2007 and post-Kaby Lake, some Intel Pentium and Intel Atom (e.g. N270, N450) processors support hyper-threading. Celeron processors never supported it.

== Intel processors table ==
Processor	Series nomenclature	Code name	Production date	Features supported (instruction set)	Clock rate	Socket	Fabrication	TDP	Cores (number)	Bus speed	Cache L1	Cache L2	Cache L3	Overclock capable
4004	N/A	N/A	1971 - Nov 15	N/A	740 kHz	DIP	10-micron			2	N/A	N/A	N/A	
8008	N/A	N/A	1972 - April good	N/A	200 kHz - 800 kHz	DIP	10-micron		1	200 kHz	N/A	N/A	N/A	
8080	N/A	N/A	1974 - April	N/A	2 MHz - 3.125 MHz	DIP	6-micron		1	4 MHz	N/A	N/A	N/A	
8085	N/A	N/A	1976 - March	N/A	3 MHz, 5 MHz, 6 MHz	DIP	3-micron		1	2 MHz	N/A	N/A	N/A	
8086	N/A	N/A	1978 - June 15	N/A	10 MHz, 8 MHz, 5 MHz	DIP	3-micron		1	10 MHz, 8 MHz, 5 MHz	N/A	N/A	N/A	
8088	N/A	N/A	1979 - June	N/A	8 MHz, 5 MHz	DIP	4-micron		1	8 MHz, 5 MHz	N/A	N/A	N/A	
80286	N/A	N/A	1982 - Feb	N/A	16 MHz, 10 MHz, 6 MHz	DLPP	1.9-micron		1	22 MHz, 10 MHz, 6 MHz	N/A	N/A	N/A	
i80386	DX; SX; SL	N/A	1985–1990	N/A	33 MHz, 25 MHz, 20 MHz, 16 MHz	DLPP	1 – 1.5-micron		1	33 MHz, 25 MHz, 20 MHz, 16 MHz	N/A	N/A	N/A	
i80486	DX; SX; DX2; DX4; SL	N/A	1989–1999	N/A	25 MHz – 100 MHz	Socket 1 Socket 2 Socket 3	0.6 – 1-micron		1	25 MHz – 50 MHz	8 KiB – 16 KiB	N/A	N/A	
Intel Pentium	N/A	P5; P54C; P54CTB; P54CS	1993–1999		65 MHz – 250 MHz	Socket 2 Socket 3 Socket 4 Socket 5 Socket 7	350 nm – 800 nm	Unknown	1	50 MHz – 66 MHz	16 KiB	N/A	N/A	
Intel Pentium MMX	N/A	P55C; Tillamook	1996–1999		120 MHz – 300 MHz	Socket 7	250 nm – 350 nm	Unknown	1	60 MHz – 66 MHz	32 KiB	N/A	N/A	
Intel Atom	Z5xx; Z6xx; N2xx; 2xx 3xx N4xx; D4xx; D5xx; N5xx; D2xxx; N2xxx	Diamondville; Pineview; Silverthorne; Lincroft; Cedarview; Medfield; Clover Trail	2008–2009 (as Centrino Atom); 2008–present (as Atom)		800 MHz – 2.13 GHz	Socket PBGA437; Socket PBGA441; Socket micro-FCBGA8 559	32 nm, 45 nm	0.65 W – 13 W	1, 2 or 4	400 MHz, 533 MHz, 667 MHz, 2.5 GT/s	56 KiB per core	512 KiB – 1 MiB	N/A	
Intel Celeron	3xx 4xx 5xx	Banias; Cedar Mill; Conroe; Coppermine; Covington; Dothan; Mendocino; Northwood; Prescott; Tualatin; Willamette; Yonah; Merom; Penryn; Arrandale; Sandy Bridge; Ivy Bridge; Haswell; Broadwell; Bay Trail-M; Braswell; Skylake; Golden Cove	1998–2023		266 MHz – 3.6 GHz	Slot 1 Socket 370; Socket 478; Socket 479; Socket 495; LGA 775; Socket M Socket P FCBGA6 μFC-BGA 956; BGA479; Socket G1; BGA-1288; Socket G2; BGA-1023; Socket G3; BGA-1168; BGA-1364; BGA-1168; FC-BGA 1170; BGA 1356; LGA 1156; LGA 1155; FC-BGA 1170; LGA 1150; LGA 1151; BGA 1440	Intel 7, 14 nm, 22 nm, 32 nm, 45 nm, 65 nm, 90 nm, 130 nm, 180 nm, 250 nm	4 W – 86 W	1, 2 or 4	66 MHz, 100 MHz, 133 MHz, 400 MHz, 533 MHz, 800 MHz	8 KiB – 64 KiB per core	0 KiB – 1 MiB	0 KiB – 2 MiB	
Intel Pentium Pro	52x	P6	1995–1998		150 MHz – 200 MHz	Socket 8	350 nm, 500 nm	29.2 W – 47 W	1	60 MHz, 66 MHz	16 KiB	256 KiB, 512 KiB, 1024 KiB	N/A	
Pentium II	52x	Klamath; Deschutes; Tonga; Dixon	1997–1999		233 MHz – 450 MHz	Slot 1 MMC-1; MMC-2; Mini-Cartridge	250 nm, 350 nm	16.8 W – 38.2 W	1	66 MHz, 100 MHz	32KiB	256 KiB – 512 KiB	N/A	
Pentium III	52x 53x	Katmai; Coppermine; Tualatin	1999–2003		450 MHz – 1.4 GHz	Slot 1 Socket 370	130 nm, 180 nm, 250 nm	17 W – 34.5 W	1	100 MHz, 133 MHz	32 KiB	256 KiB – 512 KiB	N/A	
Intel Xeon	n3xxx n5xxx n7xxx	Allendale; Cascades; Clovertown; Conroe; Cranford; Dempsey; Drake; Dunnington; Foster; Gainestown; Gallatin; Harpertown; Irwindale; Kentsfield; Nocona; Paxville; Potomac; Prestonia; Sossaman; Tanner; Tigerton; Tulsa; Wolfdale; Woodcrest	1998–present		400 MHz – 4.4 GHz	Slot 2 Socket 603; Socket 604; Socket J Socket T Socket B LGA 1150; LGA 1155; LGA 1156; LGA 1366; LGA 2011; LGA 2011v3 LGA 2066	Intel 7, 14 nm, 22 nm, 32 nm, 45 nm, 65 nm, 90 nm, 130 nm, 180 nm, 250 nm	16 W – 165 W	Up to 28 Cores (with hyperthreading)	100 MHz, 133 MHz, 400 MHz, 533 MHz, 667 MHz, 800 MHz, 1066 MHz, 1333 MHz, 1600 MHz, 4.8 GT/s, 5.86 GT/s, 6.4 GT/s	8 KiB ~ 64 KiB per core	256 KiB – 12 MiB	4 MiB – 16 MiB	
Pentium 4	5xx 6xx	Cedar Mill; Northwood; Prescott; Willamette	2000–2008		1.3 GHz – 3.8 GHz	Socket 423; Socket 478; LGA 775; Socket T	65 nm, 90 nm, 130 nm, 180 nm	21 W – 115 W	1 /w hyperthreading	400 MHz, 533 MHz, 800 MHz, 1066 MHz	8 KiB – 16 KiB	256 KiB – 2 MiB	2 MiB	
Pentium 4	5xx 6xx	Gallatin; Prescott 2M	2000–2008		3.2 GHz – 3.73 GHz	Socket 478; Socket T	90 nm, 130 nm	92 W – 115 W	1 /w hyperthreading	800 MHz, 1066 MHz	8 KiB	512 KiB – 1 MiB	0 KiB – 2 MiB	
Pentium M	7xx	Banias; Dothan	2003–2008		800 MHz – 2.266 GHz	Socket 479	90 nm, 130 nm	5.5 W – 27 W	1	400 MHz, 533 MHz	32 KiB	1 MiB – 2 MiB	N/A	
Pentium D/EE	8xx 9xx	Smithfield; Presler	2005–2008		2.66 GHz – 3.73 GHz	Socket T	65 nm, 90 nm	95 W – 130 W	2	533 MHz, 800 MHz, 1066 MHz	16 KiB per core	2×1 MiB – 2×2 MiB	N/A	
Pentium Dual-Core	E2xxx; E3xxx; E5xxx; T2xxx; T3xxx	Allendale; Penryn; Wolfdale; Yonah	2006–2009		1.6 GHz – 2.93 GHz	Socket 775; Socket M Socket P Socket T	45 nm, 65 nm	10 W – 65 W	2	533 MHz, 667 MHz, 800 MHz, 1066 MHz	64 KiB per core	1 MiB – 2 MiB	N/A	
Intel Pentium (2009)	E2xx0; E5xxx; E6xxx; T2xxx; T3xx; T4xxx; SU2xxx; SU4xxx; G69xx; P6xxx; U5xxx; G6xx; G8xx; B9xx; G2xxx; 2xxx G3xxx; 3xxx J2xx0; J3xxx; N3xxx; G4xx0; 4xxx	Penryn; Wolfdale; Clarkdale; Sandy Bridge; Ivy Bridge; Haswell; Bay Trail-D; Braswell; Skylake; Golden Cove	2009–2023		1.2 GHz – 3.33 GHz	Socket 775; Socket P Socket T LGA 1156; LGA 1155; LGA 1150; LGA 1151; LGA 1200; LGA 1700	Intel 7, 14 nm, 22 nm, 32 nm, 45 nm, 65 nm	2.9 W – 73 W	1 or 2, 2 /w hyperthreading	800 MHz, 1066 MHz, 2.5GT/s, 5 GT/s	64 KiB per core	2x256 KiB – 2 MiB	0 KiB – 3 MiB	
Intel Core	Txxxx; Lxxxx; Uxxxx	Yonah	2006–2008		1.06 GHz – 2.33 GHz	Socket M	65 nm	5.5 W – 49 W	1 or 2	533 MHz, 667 MHz	64 KiB per core	2 MiB	N/A	
Intel Core 2	Uxxxx; Lxxxx; Exxxx; Txxxx; P7xxx; Xxxxx; Qxxxx; QXxxxx	Allendale; Conroe; Merom; Penryn; Kentsfield; Wolfdale; Yorkfield	2006–2011		1.06 GHz – 3.33 GHz	Socket 775; Socket M Socket P Socket J Socket T	45 nm, 65 nm	5.5 W – 150 W	1, 2 or 4	533 MHz, 667 MHz, 800 MHz, 1066 MHz, 1333 MHz, 1600 MHz	64 KiB per core	1 MiB – 12 MiB	N/A	
Intel Core i3	i3-xxx i3-2xxx i3-3xxx i3-4xxx i3-61xx i3-63xx i3-71xx i3-73xx i3-81xx i3-83xx i3-91xx i3-93xx i3-101xx i3-103xx	Arrandale; Clarkdale; Sandy Bridge; Ivy Bridge; Haswell; Skylake; Kaby Lake; Coffee Lake; Comet Lake; Golden Cove	2010–present		800 MHz – 4.0 GHz	LGA 1156; LGA 1155; LGA 1150; LGA 1151; LGA 1200; LGA 1700	Intel 7, 14 nm, 22 nm, 32 nm	35 W – 91 W	2 /w hyperthreading, 4, 4 /w hyperthreading	1066 MHz, 1600 MHz, 2.5 - 5 GT/s	64 KiB per core	256 KiB	3 MiB – 4 MiB	
Intel Core i5	i5-7xx i5-6xx i5-2xxx i5-3xxx i5-4xxx i5-5675C i5-64xx i5-65xx i5-66xx i5-74xx i5-75xx i5-76xx i5-84xx i5-85xx i5-86xx i5-94xx i5-95xx i5-96xx i5-104xx i5-105xx i5-106xx i5-114xx i5-115xx i5-116xx	Arrandale; Clarkdale; Clarksfield; Lynnfield; Sandy Bridge; Ivy Bridge; Haswell; Broadwell; Skylake; Kaby Lake; Coffee Lake; Comet Lake; Cypress Cove; Golden Cove; Gracemont	2009–present		1.06 GHz – 4.2 GHz	LGA 1156; LGA 1155; LGA 1150; LGA 1151; LGA 1200; LGA 1700	Intel 7, 14 nm, 22 nm, 32 nm, 45 nm	17 W – 125 W	2 - 6 /w hyperthreading,	2.5 – 8 GT/s	64 ~ 80 KiB per core	256 ~ 512 KiB	4 MiB – 12 MiB	
Intel Core i7	i7-6xx i7-7xx i7-8xx i7-9xx i7-2xxx i7-37xx i7-38xx i7-47xx i7-48xx i7-5775C i7-58xx i7-59xx i7-67xx i7-68xx i7-69xx i7-77xx i7-8086K i7-87xx i7-97xx i7-107xx i7-117xx	Bloomfield; Nehalem; Clarksfield; Lynnfield; Sandy Bridge; Ivy Bridge; Haswell; Haswell Refresh, Devil‘s Canyon; Broadwell; Skylake; Kaby Lake; Coffee Lake; Comet Lake; Cypress Cove; Golden Cove; Gracemont	2008–present		1.1 GHz – 4.4 GHz	LGA 1156; LGA 1155; LGA 1366; LGA 2011; LGA 1150; LGA 1151; LGA 1200; LGA 1700	Intel 7, 14 nm, 22 nm, 32 nm, 45 nm	35 W – 130 W	4 - 6 - 8 /w hyperthreading	4.8 GT/s, 8 GT/s	64 ~ 80 KiB per core	256 ~ 512 KiB per core	6 MiB – 16 MiB	
Intel Core i7 (Extreme Edition)	i7-970 i7-980 i7-980x i7-990x i7-39xx i7-49xx i7-5820K i7-59xx i7-6800K i7-6850K i7-6900K i7-6950X (i5-7640X) i7-7740X i7-7820X	Gulftown; Sandy Bridge-E; Ivy Bridge-E; Haswell-E; Broadwell-E; Skylake; Kaby Lake	2011–present		3.0 GHz – 5.0 GHz	LGA 1366; LGA 2011; LGA 2011-v3 LGA 2066	14 nm, 22 nm, 32 nm	130 W – 150 W	4, 6, 8 or 10 (with hyperthreading)	2.5GT/s – 8 GT/s	64 KiB per core	256 KiB per core	12 MiB – 20 MiB	Yes
Intel Core i9	i9-9900K i9-9900 i9-9900T i9-10850K i9-10900K i9-10900 i9-10900T i9-11900K i9-11900 i9-11900T i9-8950HK i9-9880H i9-9980HK i9-10885H i9-10980HK	Coffee Lake; Comet Lake; Cypress Cove; Golden Cove; Gracemont	2018–present		3.0 GHz – 5.3 GHz	LGA 1151; LGA 1200; LGA 1700	Intel 7, 14 nm	35 W – 125 W	6 - 8 - 10 /w hyperthreading	8 GT/s	64 ~ 80 KiB per core	256 ~ 512 KiB per core	16 MiB	Some
Intel Core i9 (Extreme Edition)	i9-7900X i9-7920X i9-7940X i9-7960X i9-7980XE	Kaby Lake; Cascade Lake	Q3 2017–present		2.90 GHz – 4.30 GHz	LGA 2066	14 nm	35 W – 165 W	8 - 18 (with hyperthreading)	8 GT/s	64 KiB per core	1 MiB per core	13.75 MiB – 24.75 MiB	Yes
Processor	Series nomenclature	Code name	Production date	Features supported (instruction set)	Clock rate	Socket	Fabrication	TDP	Cores (number)	Bus speed	Cache L1	Cache L2	Cache L3	Overclock capable

== See also ==
- Intel Corporation
- List of Intel processors
  - List of Intel Atom processors
  - List of Intel Itanium processors
  - List of Intel Celeron processors
  - List of Intel Pentium processors
  - List of Intel Pentium Pro processors
  - List of Intel Pentium II processors
  - List of Intel Pentium III processors
  - List of Intel Pentium 4 processors
  - List of Intel Pentium D processors
  - List of Intel Pentium M processors
  - List of Intel Xeon processors
  - List of Intel Core processors
  - List of Intel Core 2 processors
  - List of Intel Core i3 processors
  - List of Intel Core i5 processors
  - List of Intel Core i7 processors
  - List of Intel Core i9 processors
- List of Intel CPU microarchitectures
- List of AMD processors
- List of AMD CPU microarchitectures
- Table of AMD processors
- List of AMD graphics processing units
- List of Intel graphics processing units
- List of Nvidia graphics processing units

Atom (ULV)		Node name	Pentium/Core						
Microarch.	Step	Node name	Microarch.	Step					
		600 nm	P6	Pentium Pro (133 MHz)					
		500 nm	P6	Pentium Pro (150 MHz)					
		350 nm	P6	Pentium Pro (166–200 MHz)					
		350 nm	P6	Klamath					
		250 nm	P6	Deschutes					
		250 nm	P6	Katmai	NetBurst				
		180 nm	P6	Coppermine	Willamette				
		130 nm	P6	Tualatin	Northwood				
		130 nm	Pentium M	Banias	Northwood		NetBurst(HT)		NetBurst(×2)
		90 nm	Pentium M	Dothan	Prescott	⇨	Prescott‑2M	⇨	Smithfield
		90 nm	Pentium M	Dothan	~~Tejas~~	→	⇩	→	~~Cedarmill (Tejas)~~
		65 nm	Pentium M	Yonah	~~Nehalem (NetBurst)~~		Cedar Mill	⇨	Presler
		65 nm	Core	Merom	4 cores on mainstream desktop, DDR3 introduced				
Bonnell	Bonnell	45 nm	Core	Penryn					
Bonnell	Bonnell	45 nm	Nehalem	Nehalem	HT reintroduced, integrated MC, PCH; L3-cache introduced, 256 KB L2-cache/core				
Bonnell	Saltwell	32 nm	Nehalem	Westmere	Introduced GPU on same package and AES-NI				
Bonnell	Saltwell	32 nm	Sandy Bridge	Sandy Bridge	On-die ring bus, no more non-UEFI motherboards				
Silvermont	Silvermont	22 nm	Sandy Bridge	Ivy Bridge					
Silvermont	Silvermont	22 nm	Haswell	Haswell	Fully integrated voltage regulator				
Silvermont	Airmont	14 nm	Haswell	Broadwell					
Silvermont	Airmont	14 nm	Skylake	Skylake	DDR4 introduced on mainstream desktop				
Goldmont	Goldmont	14 nm	Skylake	Kaby Lake					
Goldmont	Goldmont	14 nm	Skylake	Coffee Lake	6 cores on mainstream desktop				
Goldmont	Goldmont	14 nm	Skylake	Amber Lake	Mobile-only				
Goldmont Plus	Goldmont Plus	14 nm	Skylake	Whiskey Lake	Mobile-only				
Goldmont Plus	Goldmont Plus	14 nm	Skylake	Coffee Lake Refresh	8 cores on mainstream desktop				
Goldmont Plus	Goldmont Plus	14 nm	Skylake	Comet Lake	10 cores on mainstream desktop				
Goldmont Plus	Goldmont Plus	14 nm	Sunny Cove	Cypress Cove (Rocket Lake)	Backported Sunny Cove microarchitecture for 14 nm				
Tremont	Tremont	10 nm	Skylake	Palm Cove (Cannon Lake)	Mobile-only				
Tremont	Tremont	10 nm	Sunny Cove	Sunny Cove (Ice Lake)	512 KB L2-cache/core				
Tremont	Tremont	10 nm	Sunny Cove	Willow Cove (Tiger Lake)	X^{e} graphics engine				
Gracemont	Gracemont	Intel 7 (10 nm ESF)	Golden Cove	Golden Cove (Alder Lake)	Hybrid, DDR5, PCIe 5.0				
Gracemont	Gracemont	Intel 7 (10 nm ESF)	Golden Cove	Raptor Cove (Raptor Lake)					
Crestmont	Crestmont	Intel 4	Redwood Cove	Meteor Lake	Mobile-only; NPU, chiplet architecture				
Crestmont	Crestmont	Intel 3	Redwood Cove	Arrow Lake-U					
Skymont	Skymont	N3B (TSMC)	Lion Cove	Lunar Lake	Low power mobile only (9–30 W)				
Skymont	Skymont	N3B (TSMC)	Lion Cove	Arrow Lake					
Darkmont	Darkmont	Intel 18A	Cougar Cove	Panther Lake					
Arctic Wolf	Arctic Wolf	Intel 18A	Coyote Cove	Nova Lake					
