= List of Intel Pentium II processors =

The Pentium II is a sixth-generation CPU from Intel targeted at the consumer market.

== Desktop processors ==
=== "Klamath" (350 nm) ===
- All models support: MMX
- L2 cache is off-die and runs at 50% CPU speed
- Part numbers prefixed with a B are for boxed retail CPUs

| Model | Clock rate | L2 cache | FSB | Mult. | Voltage | TDP | Socket | Release date | Release price (USD) |
|---|---|---|---|---|---|---|---|---|---|
| Pentium II 233 | 233 MHz | 512 KB | 66 MT/s | 3.5× | 2.8 V | 34.8 W | Slot 1 | May 7, 1997 | $636 |
| Pentium II 266 | 267 MHz | 512 KB | 66 MT/s | 4× | 2.8 V | 38.2 W | Slot 1 | May 7, 1997 | $775 |
| Pentium II 300 | 300 MHz | 512 KB | 66 MT/s | 4.5× | 2.8 V | 43 W | Slot 1 | May 7, 1997 | $1981 |

=== "Deschutes" (250 nm) ===
- All models support: MMX
- L2 cache is off-die and runs at 50% CPU speed
- The Pentium II OverDrive is a Deschutes Pentium II core packaged for Socket 8 operation. It comes with 512 KB of off-die full-speed L2 cache, which makes it very similar to the Pentium II Xeon.

| Model | Clock rate | L2 cache | FSB | Mult. | Voltage | TDP | Socket | Release date | Release price (USD) |
|---|---|---|---|---|---|---|---|---|---|
| Pentium II 266 | 267 MHz | 512 KB | 66 MT/s | 4× | 2.0 V | 16.8 W | Slot 1 | late 1998 | OEM |
| Pentium II 300 | 300 MHz | 512 KB | 66 MT/s | 4.5× | 2.0 V | 18.6 W | Slot 1 | late 1998 | OEM |
| Pentium II 333 | 333 MHz | 512 KB | 66 MT/s | 5× | 2.0 V | 20.6 W | Slot 1 | January 26, 1998 | $722 |
| Pentium II Overdrive | 333 MHz | 512 KB | 66 MT/s | 5× | 3.3 V | | Socket 8 | August 10, 1998 | $599 |
| Pentium II 350 | 350 MHz | 512 KB | 100 MT/s | 3.5× | 2.0 V | 21.5 W | Slot 1 | April 15, 1998 | $621 |
| Pentium II 400 | 400 MHz | 512 KB | 100 MT/s | 4× | 2.0 V | 24.3 W | Slot 1 | April 15, 1998 | $824 |
| Pentium II 450 | 450 MHz | 512 KB | 100 MT/s | 4.5× | 2.0 V | 27.1 W | Slot 1 | August 24, 1998 | $669 |

== Mobile processors ==
=== "Tonga" (250 nm) ===
- All models support: MMX
- L2 cache is off-die and runs at 50% CPU speed

| Model | Clock rate | L2 cache | FSB | Mult. | Voltage | TDP | Socket | Release date | Release price (USD) |
|---|---|---|---|---|---|---|---|---|---|
| Mobile Pentium II 233 | 233 MHz | 512 KB | 66 MT/s | 3.5× | 1.6 V | 9.0 W | MMC-1; MMC-2 | April 2, 1998 | $542 |
| Mobile Pentium II 266 | 267 MHz | 512 KB | 66 MT/s | 4× | 1.6 V | 10.3 W | MMC-1; MMC-2 | April 2, 1998 | $772 |
| Mobile Pentium II 300 | 300 MHz | 512 KB | 66 MT/s | 4.5× | 1.6 V | 11.1 W | MMC-1; MMC-2 | September 9, 1998 | $710 |

=== "Dixon" (250 or 180 nm) ===
- All models support: MMX
- L2 cache is on-die and runs at 100% CPU speed
- Also known as Pentium II "Performance Enhanced"
- mqbA1 stepping is actually at 180 nm 27.4 million transistors die size 180 mm^{2}

| Model | Clock rate | L2 cache | FSB | Mult. | Voltage | TDP | Socket | Release date | Release price (USD) |
|---|---|---|---|---|---|---|---|---|---|
| Mobile Pentium II 266PE | 267 MHz | 256 KB | 66 MT/s | 4× | 1.6 V | 10.3 W | μPGA2; BGA2; MMC-2 | January 25, 1999 | $187 |
| Mobile Pentium II 300PE | 300 MHz | 256 KB | 66 MT/s | 4.5× | 1.6 V | 11.6 W | μPGA2; BGA2; MMC-2 | January 25, 1999 | $321 |
| Mobile Pentium II 333 | 333 MHz | 256 KB | 66 MT/s | 5× | 1.6 V | 11.8 W | μPGA2; BGA2; MMC-2 | January 25, 1999 | $465 |
| Mobile Pentium II 366 | 367 MHz | 256 KB | 66 MT/s | 5.5× | 1.6 V | 13.1 W | μPGA2; BGA2; MMC-2 | January 25, 1999 | $696 |
| Mobile Pentium II 400 | 400 MHz | 256 KB | 66 MT/s | 6× | 1.55 or 1.50 V | 13.1 W | μPGA2; BGA2; MMC-2 | June 14, 1999 | $530 |

== See also ==
- List of Intel Pentium processors
- List of Intel Pentium Pro processors
- List of Intel Pentium III processors
- List of Intel processors
- List of microprocessors
