= Intel P2 =

Intel P2 may refer to:

- Intel Pentium II, a 6th generation Intel CPU design
- Intel 80286, a 2nd generation Intel processor design
