= Phil Hester =

Phil Hester may refer to:

- Phillip Doyce Hester (1955–2013), chief technology officer of Advanced Micro Devices
- Phil Hester (comics) (born 1966), comic book artist and writer
