= Tarari, Inc. =

Company that spun out of Intel in 2002

Tarari, Inc. is a company that spun out of Intel in 2002. It has created a range of re-programmable silicon based on Xilinx Virtex-4 FPGA (Field Programmable Gate Array) and ASICs that offload and accelerate really complex algorithms such as XML Parsing, scanning for Computer viruses, email spam and intruders in Intrusion-prevention systems and Unified threat management appliances. As well as inspecting content its Content Processors can also transform content and they are used for XML transformation XSLT, compression, encryption as well as HD Video encoding for WMV and VC-1 formats.

In June 2006, Tarari announced that its next generation chips that will support the AMD Torrenza initiative - and it will incorporate HyperTransport interfaces. HyperTransport based-systems offer a dramatically reduced latency and increased throughput. This is because a HyperTransport connected system allows a co-processor to have direct access to the system's HyperTransport bus, and thus as much access to system resources as other conventional CPUs.

PCI-Express and HyperTransport buses both allow systems to communicate at 20-25 Gbit/s versus 4-8 Gbit/s for Peripheral Component Interconnect PCI/PCI-X based systems. Just as the latest desktop machines are using PCI-Express for their high-performance graphic cards now servers will be able to use these high speed interconnects to add other hardware-based co-processors.

PCI-Express and HyperTransport buses both operate serially using multiple lanes - PCI-Express supports 1, 2, 4 or 8 lane connectivity at 2.5 Gbit/s per lane. Whereas PCI/PCI-X works using parallel transfers and is most efficient in the 2k - 4k byte per transfer range, PCI-Express and HyperTransport are very efficient at transfers as small as just 64 bytes. Therefore, applications such as in intrusion-prevention system (IPS) and VOIP security applications which have to examine a large volume of small packets will benefit from such high-speed and highly efficient transfer capabilities.

On 5 September 2007, LSI Corporation announced a definitive agreement to acquire Tarari.
