= AMD Horus =

The Horus system, designed by Newisys for AMD, was created to enable AMD Opteron machines to extend beyond the current limit of 8-way (CPU sockets) architectures. The Opteron CPUs feature a cache-coherent HyperTransport (ccHT) bus to permit glueless, multiprocessor interconnect between physical CPU packages but as there is a maximum of three ccHT interfaces per chip, the systems are limited to a maximum of 8 sockets. The HyperTransport bus is also distance restricted and does not permit off-system interconnect.

The Horus system overcomes these limitations by creating a pseudo-Opteron, the Horus chip, which connects to four real Opterons via the HyperTransport bus. As far as the Opterons are concerned they are in a five-way system and this is the basic Horus node (as called 'quad'). The Horus chip then provides an additional off-board interface (based on the InfiniBand standards) which can link to additional Horus nodes (up to 8). The chip handles the necessary translation between local and off-board ccHT communications. By building the CPUs around the Horus chip with 12-bit lanes running at 3125 MHz with InfiniBand technology (8b/10b encoding), this system has an effective internal speed of 30 Gbit/s.

With 8 'quads' connected together, each with the maximum of four Opteron sockets per node, the Horus system allows a total of 32 CPU sockets in a single machine. Dual and future quad-core chips will also be supported, allowing a single system to scale to over a hundred processing cores.

== See also ==
- Heterogeneous System Architecture
