= Newisys =

American technology company

Newisys was an American technology company. At various times it sold computers for data centers (known as servers), and computer data storage products. It operated as a subsidiary of Sanmina Corporation since 2004.

== History ==
Newisys was founded in July 2000 by Claymon A. Cipione and Phillip Doyce Hester, both from IBM. It was originally based in Austin, Texas. By the end of 2000, almost $28 million in venture capital funding was obtained from New Enterprise Associates, Austin Ventures, and Advanced Micro Devices (AMD). By 2002, they gave demonstrations of server using 64-bit AMD processors. Another round of about $23 million funding was announced in November 2002, increased to $25 million in February 2003. In July 2003, Sanmina-SCI (which had been a manufacturing partner) announced it would acquire Newisys for an undisclosed amount. Newisys became an original design manufacturer for Sanminia. In 2005, Hester left to become the chief technical officer of AMD until 2008, and Cipione also left to join AMD to become chief information officer.

In August 2005, a network-attached storage server product called the NA-1400 was announced, although shipments were reported to be delayed. It used an XScale 80219 processor from Intel. In November 2005, Newisys announced an integrated circuit call the AMD Horus, which allowed servers to be built with large numbers of AMD Opteron processors. In January 2006, the company acquired the block storage division of Adaptec, located in Colorado Springs, Colorado. In May 2007, the server portion of the company was shut down, leaving storage (developed in Colorado) as the main focus.

Newisys returned to the server market in 2013 by adding Intel based servers into their storage products.
