= Mobile Module Connector =

The Mobile Module Connector (MMC) is a discontinued series of microprocessor cartridges developed by Intel for use with their mobile processors, including the Pentium, Pentium MMX, Pentium II, Pentium III, and Celeron processors. The series consists of the MMC-1 and the MMC-2. Both were introduced in 1997. It was phased out beginning in 1999, when Intel began integrating the L2 cache on their chips. The sudden move from processor to cartridge back to processor reportedly caused issues for notebook computer ODMs.

== MMC-1 ==
MMC-1 with Mobile Pentium II

Mobile Module Connector 1 (MMC-1) is a 280-pin microprocessor cartridge developed by Intel for used by their mobile Pentium, Pentium MMX, Pentium II and Celeron processors. It contains the microprocessor and its associated L2 cache, a 430TX for the Pentium or a 443BX for the Pentium II northbridge, and a voltage regulator.

Intel Mobile Pentium II 300 MHz 512kB L2 Cache

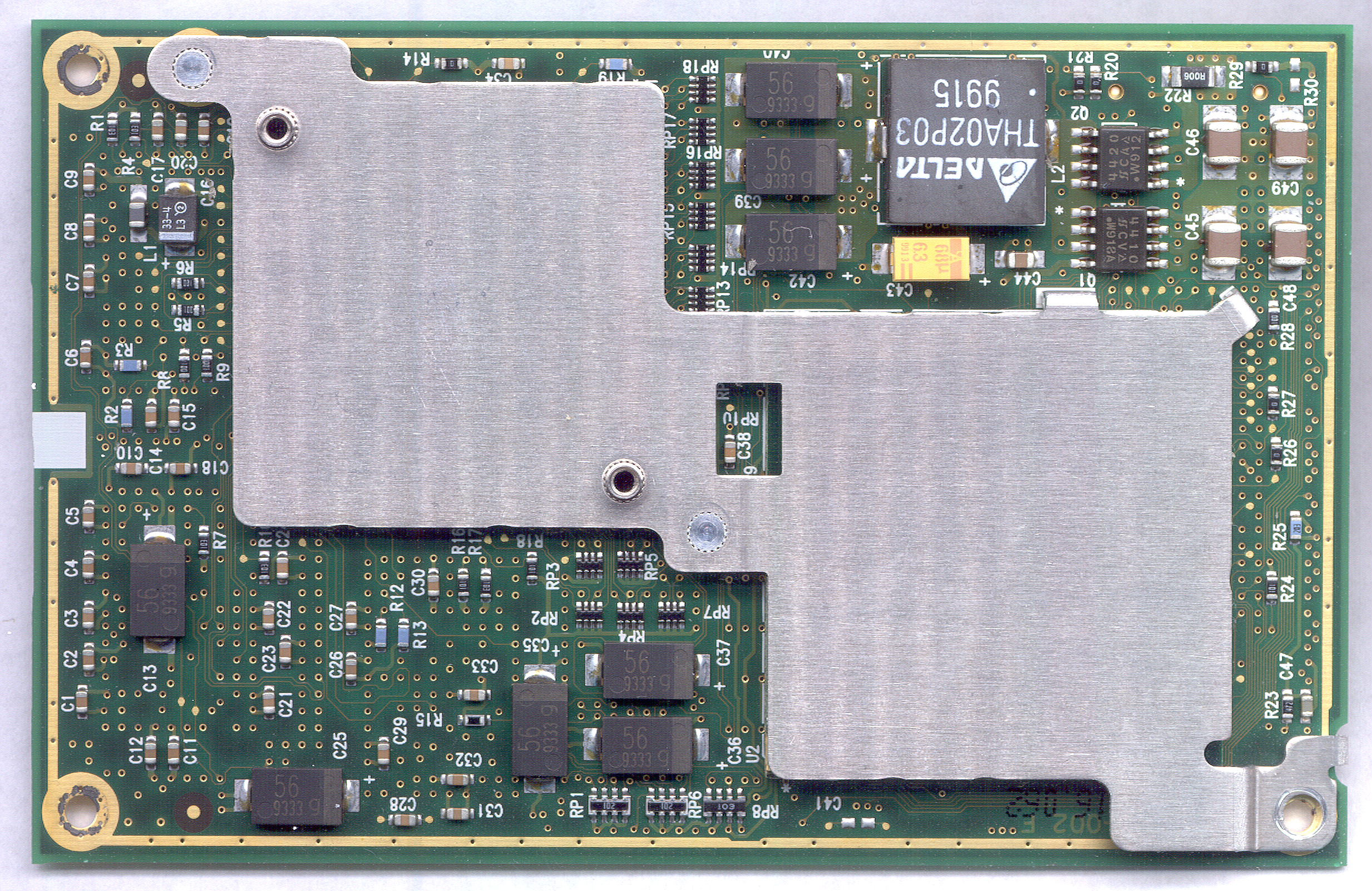

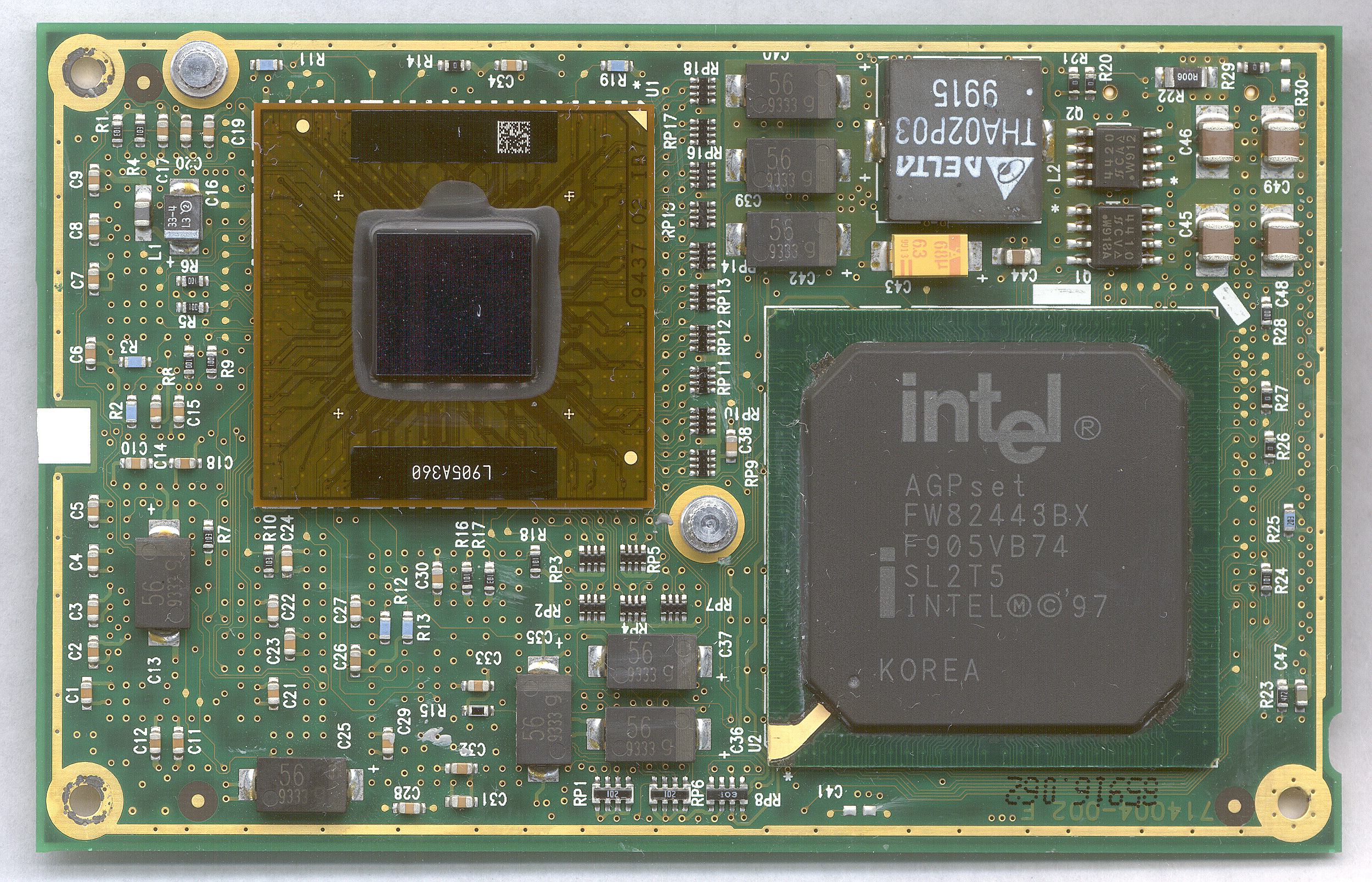

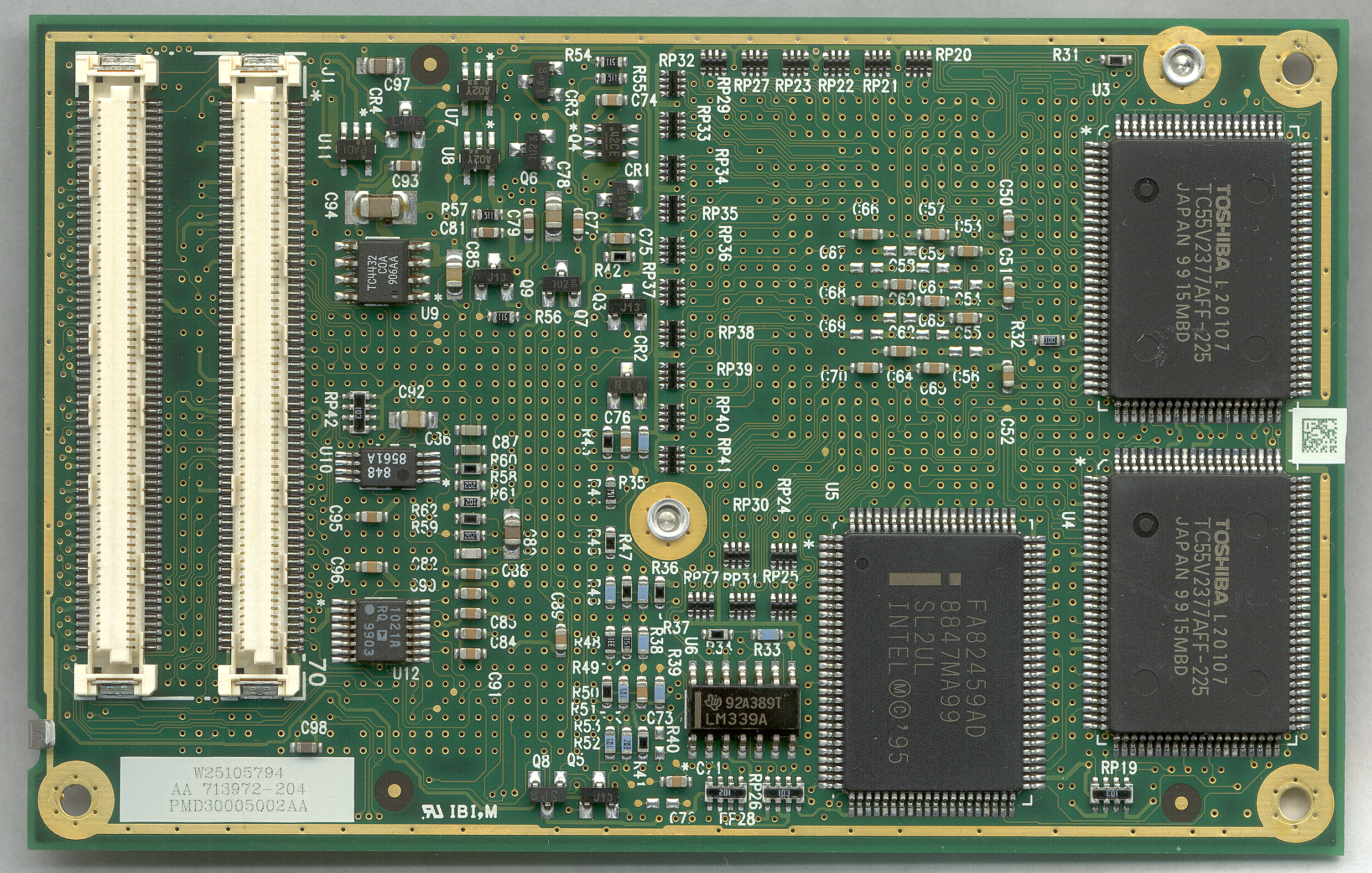

== MMC-2 ==
Mobile Module Connector 2 (MMC-2) is Intel's 400-pin processor cartridge used with Pentium II, Celeron and Pentium III mobile processors. It contains CPU, 443BX (Pentium II) Northbridge, off-die L2 cache (early Pentium II only) and voltage regulator. It is the successor of MMC-1, main differences being AGP interface and 100 MHz FSB for the Pentium III. This processor cartridge was widely used on laptops from the late 1990s to early 2000s.

Fastest processors in the MMC-2 form factor are:

- Pentium II 400/256
- Pentium III 850/256
- Celeron 700/128
- Unofficially Pentium III 1000/256, this was achieved by removing the chip off an MMC-2 socket card and soldering a Pentium III 1000 processor on the board
Intel Mobile Pentium III 650 MHz 256kB L2 Cache

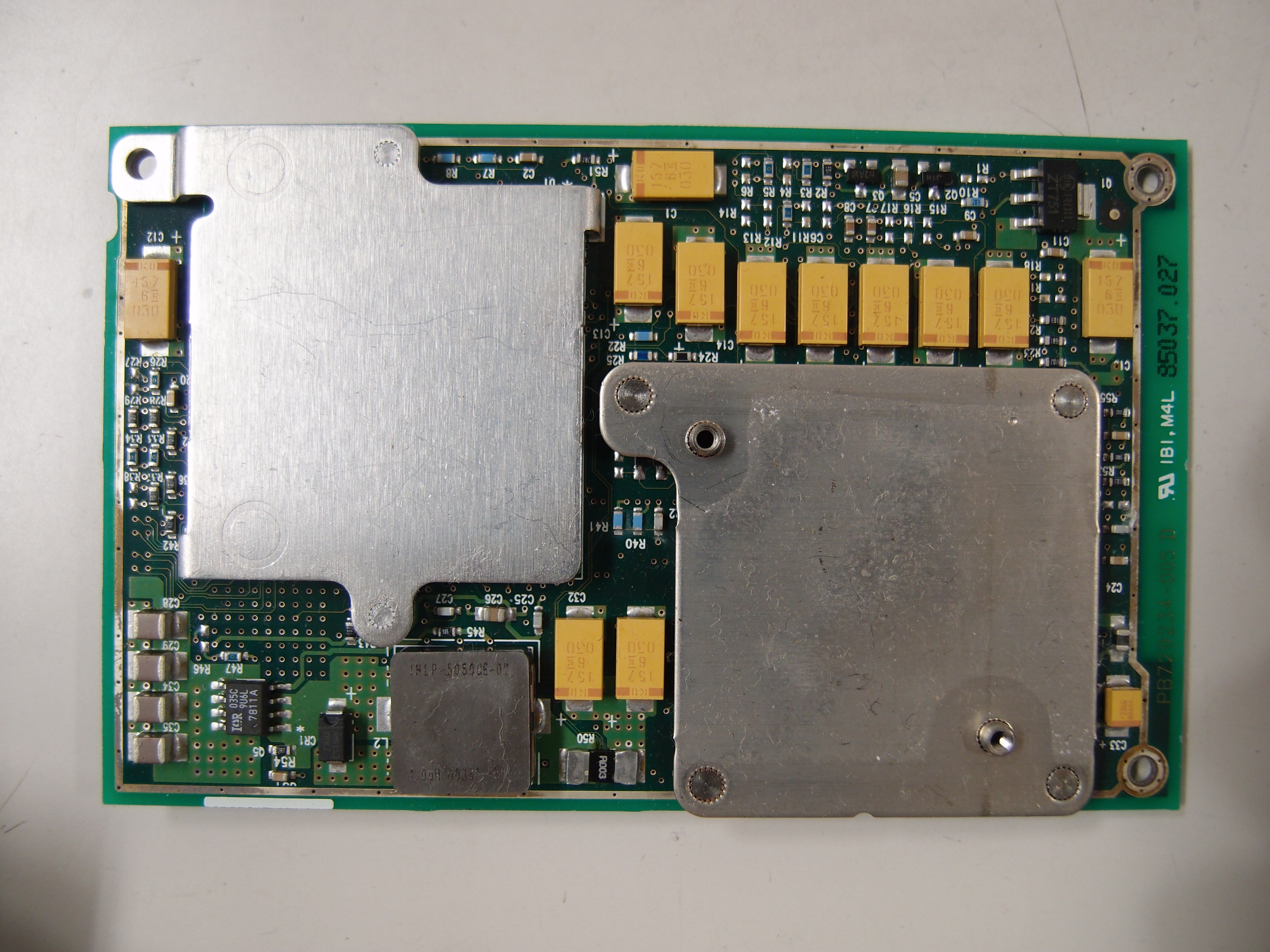

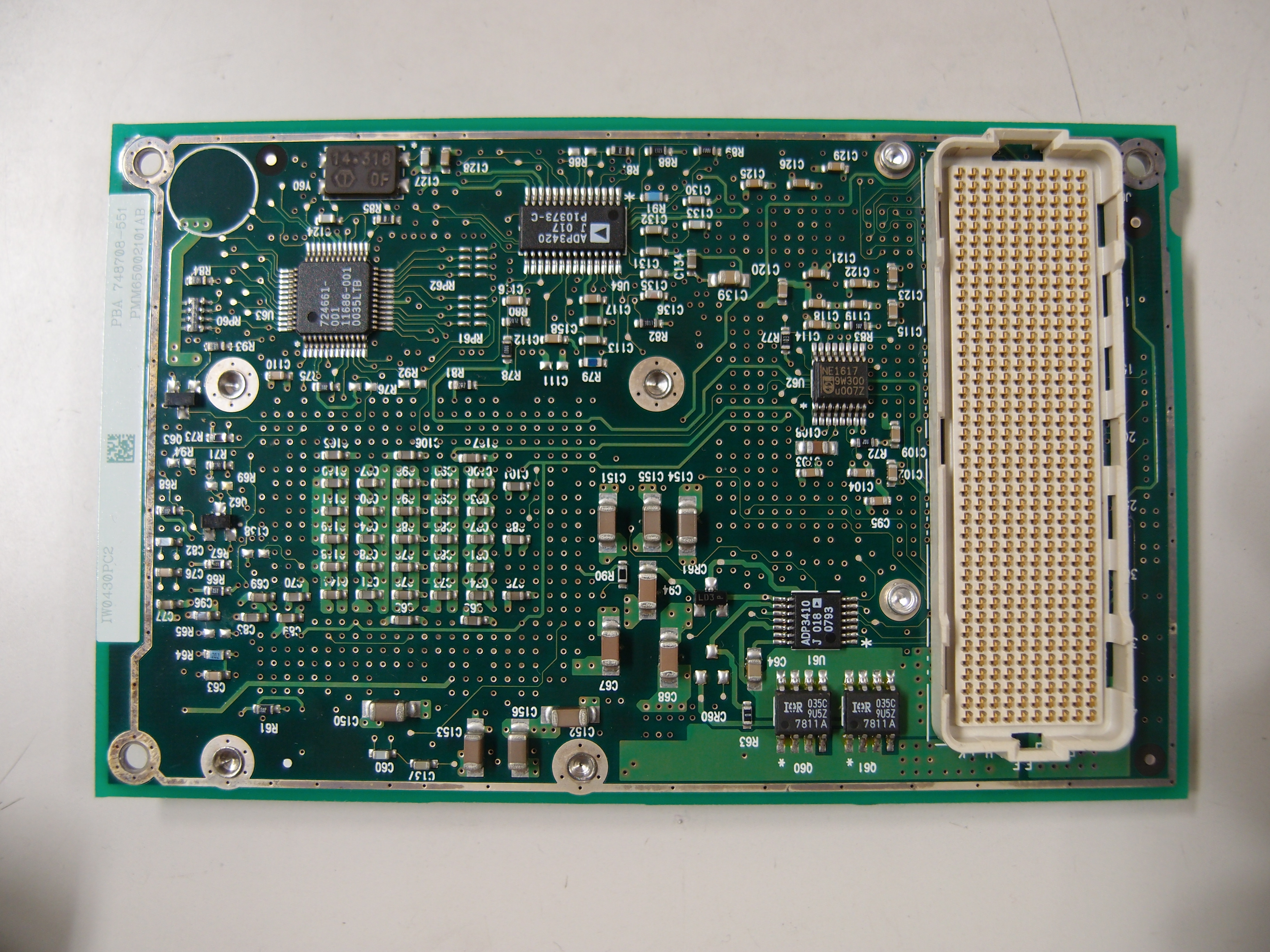
