= Mini-Cartridge =

Intel's 240-pin multi-chip module for their mobile Pentium II processors

The Mini-Cartridge or Mobile Mini-Cartridge was Intel's 240-pin multi-chip module for their mobile Pentium II processors. It contained the CPU core, as well as separate cache chips and a thermal sensor.
