= HyperTransport Consortium =

Body responsible for regulating and promoting the HyperTransport technology

Logo of the HyperTransport Consortium

The HyperTransport Consortium is an industry consortium responsible for specifying and promoting the computer bus technology called HyperTransport.

== Organizational form ==
The Technical Working Group along with several Task Forces manage the HyperTransport specification and drive new developments. A Marketing Working Group promotes the use of the technology and the consortium.

== History ==
It was founded in 2001 by Advanced Micro Devices, API NetWorks, Apple Computer, Cisco Systems, NVIDIA, PMC-Sierra, Sun Microsystems, and Transmeta. As of 2009 it has over 50 members.

== Executives ==
As of 2009, Mike Uhler of AMD is the President of the Consortium, Mario Cavalli is the General Manager, Brian Holden of PMC-Sierra is both the Vice President and the Chair of the Technical Working Group, Deepika Sarai is the Treasurer.
