= Phillip Doyce Hester =

Phil Hester
- Phil Hester in 2009.
- Born: April 30, 1955; Corpus Christi, Texas, USA
- Died: September 17, 2013 (aged 58); Austin, Texas
- Education: University of Texas at Austin
- Occupations: Engineer and technology executive

Phillip ("Phil") Doyce Hester (April 30, 1955 - September 17, 2013) was an American engineer and technology executive.

== Life ==
Hester grew up in Corpus Christi, Texas, and attended Richard King High School. He held a Bachelor of Science and a master's degree in electrical engineering from the University of Texas at Austin. Hester joined IBM around 1977, serving as an engineer, eventually leading the development team for the RS/6000, and as chief technology officer and vice president of systems and technology for IBM's PC division. In the early 1990s, he co-founded the AIM alliance (originally code-named "Somerset") to promote the PowerPC architecture.

In 2000 Hester co-founded and became chief executive of Newisys, acquired by Sanmina-SCI Corporation.

Hester worked as the chief technology officer and senior vice president of semiconductor company Advanced Micro Devices, Inc. (AMD) until April 11, 2008.

In December 2009, Hester became the senior vice president of research and development at National Instruments.

Hester died September 17, 2013, in Austin, Texas. He has a son named Will and was married at the time to Joan.
