= Clarksfield (microprocessor) =

General information
- Launched: 2009
- Discontinued: 2012
- Marketed by: Intel
- Designed by: Intel
- Common manufacturer: Intel
- CPUID code: 106Ex
- Product code: 80607

Performance
- Max. CPU clock rate: 1.60 GHz to 2.13 (turbo up to 3.33) GHz
- DMI speeds: 2.5 GT/s

Physical specifications
- Cores: 4
- Memory (RAM): Up to 8 GB; Up to DDR3-1333 with 21 GB/s bandwidth
- Package: Reduced pin grid array (rPGA)
- Socket: Socket G1 (rPGA988)

Cache
- L1 cache: 256 KB (64 KB per core (32 KB instructions + 32 KB data))
- L2 cache: 1 MB (256 KB per core)
- L3 cache: 6 to 8 MB

Architecture and classification
- Application: Quad-core mobile Extreme mobile
- Technology node: 45 nm
- Microarchitecture: Nehalem
- Instruction set: x86, x86-64
- Instructions: MMX, SSE, SSE2, SSE3, SSSE3, SSE4.1, SSE4.2

Products, models, variants
- Brand names: Core i7-7xxQM; Core i7-8xxQM; Core i7-9xxXM

History
- Predecessor: Penryn-QC
- Successor: Sandy Bridge

Support status
- Unsupported

Clarksfield is the code name for an Intel processor, initially sold as mobile Intel Core i7. It is closely related to the desktop Lynnfield processor, both use quad-core dies based on the 45 nm Nehalem microarchitecture and have integrated PCI Express and DMI links.

The predecessor of Clarksfield, Penryn-QC was a multi-chip module with two dual-core Penryn dies based on Penryn microarchitecture, a shrink of Merom microarchitecture. The name of the direct successor of Clarksfield has not been announced. Arrandale is a later mobile processor but opens a new line of mid-range dual-core processors with integrated graphics.

At the time of its release at the Intel Developer Forum on September 23, 2009, Clarksfield processors were significantly faster than any other laptop processor, including the Core 2 Extreme QX9300. The initial laptop manufacturers shipping products based on Clarksfield processors include MSI, Dell/Alienware, Hewlett-Packard, Toshiba and Asustek.

== Brand names ==
All Clarksfield processors are marketed as Core i7, in three product lines differing in thermal design power and the amount of third-level cache that is enabled. See the respective lists for details about each model.

Brand Name	Model (list)	L3 Cache size	Thermal Design Power
Intel Core i7	i7-7xxQM	6 MB	45 W
Intel Core i7	i7-8xxQM	8 MB	45 W
Intel Core i7	i7-9xxXM Extreme Edition	8 MB	55 W

== See also ==
- Intel Core i7
- List of Intel Core i7 microprocessors
- Penryn (microprocessor)
- Lynnfield (microprocessor)
- Arrandale (microprocessor)
