= Cypress Cove Family Aquatic Park =

Water park in Woodridge, Illinois

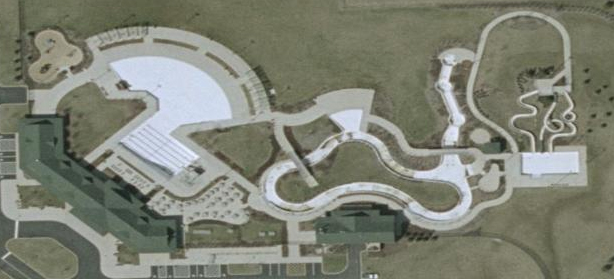
- An aerial view of Cypress Cove in 2007
- Interactive map of Cypress Cove Family Aquatic Park
- Location: Woodridge, Illinois, United States
- Coordinates: 41°44′5″N 88°2′16″W
- Theme: Bayou
- Owner: Woodridge Park District
- Operating season: May to September
- Status: Operating
- Area: 8.5 acres (3.4 ha)
- Website: Official website

Cypress Cove Family Aquatic Park (often referred to as just Cypress Cove) is a bayou-themed waterpark located in Woodridge, Illinois, operated by the Woodridge Park District.

== History ==
Cypress Cove was opened in 1997, at an approximate cost of $5.9 million. Attendance during the first partial year of operation was around 90,000.

In May 2007, the Woodridge Park District Board, by unanimous vote, approved a $3.6 million expansion. Expansion plans include the creation of a spray park for toddlers and pre-teens, improvements to the bathhouses, and the construction of a six-lane lap pool. This move came at the same time as the other pool the Park District operates, Hobson pool, was voted to be shut down due to the expense of necessary renovations. Polls showed that this proposal was favored almost 3 to 1 by Woodridge residents.

== Design ==
Cypress Cove was designed by Michael Williams, CEO Williams Architects, and was designed to allow future expansion on the 8.5-acre (34,000 m^{2}) lot. Because the park was built near wetlands in the town, Cypress Cove attempted to create a bayou theme with its architecture, including creating split-level roofs, and wood facades, as well in landscaping by planting daylilies, and wild grasses. To further this cajun theme, features are given "bayou-sounding names." The designs of the buildings were inspired by a trip by Williams to the Appalachian Mountains in the Carolinas, where he saw "rustic" cabins. His sketches served as the basis for the design of many buildings in the park.

== Features ==
- Main Pool
  - Zero-depth entrance
  - 1,500-person capacity
  - 12,000 square feet (1,100 m^{2})
  - 12-foot-deep (3.7 m) diving well
  - 1-meter diving board
- Three Body slides
- 10-foot (3.0 m) Drop Slide
- Tube slide
- 600-foot-long (180 m), 13-foot-wide (4.0 m) crazy River
- Kiddie Slide
- Water Bubblers
- Sand-play area
- Entertainment Stage
- Concession Stand

== Awards ==
- Best Waterpark in Chicago - Chicago Magazine (2003)
- Favorite Summer Hotspot - 190 North (2003)
- Brochure Award - World Waterpark Association's Wave Review (2002)
- Excellence in the Aquatics Award - National Recreation & Park Association (1999)
- Daniel Flaherty Park Excellence Recognition Award (1998)
- Outstanding Aquatic Facility Award - Illinois Parks and Recreation Association (1997)
