= Front-side bus =

Type of computer communication interface

Within a multi-core processor, the back-side bus is often internal, with front-side bus for external communication.

The front-side bus (FSB) is a computer communication interface (bus) that was often used in Intel-chip-based computers during the 1990s and 2000s. The EV6 bus served the same function for competing AMD CPUs. Both typically carry data between the central processing unit (CPU) and a memory controller hub, known as the northbridge.

Depending on the implementation, some computers may also have a back-side bus that connects the CPU to the cache. This bus and the cache connected to it are faster than accessing the system memory (or RAM) via the front-side bus. The speed of the front side bus is often used as an important measure of the performance of a computer.

The original front-side bus architecture was replaced by HyperTransport, Intel QuickPath Interconnect, and Direct Media Interface, followed by Intel Ultra Path Interconnect and AMD's Infinity Fabric.

== History ==
The term came into use by Intel Corporation about the time the Pentium Pro and Pentium II products were announced, in the 1990s.

"Front side" refers to the external interface from the processor to the rest of the computer system, as opposed to the back side, where the back-side bus connects the cache (and potentially other CPUs).

A front-side bus (FSB) is mostly used on PC-related motherboards (including personal computers and servers). They are seldom used in embedded systems or similar small computers. The FSB design was a performance improvement over the single system bus designs of the previous decades, but these front-side buses are sometimes referred to as the "system bus".

Front-side buses usually connect the CPU and the rest of the hardware via a chipset, which Intel implemented as a northbridge and a southbridge. Other buses like the Peripheral Component Interconnect (PCI), Accelerated Graphics Port (AGP), and memory buses all connect to the chipset in order for data to flow between the connected devices. These secondary system buses usually run at speeds derived from the front-side bus clock, but are not necessarily synchronized to it.

In response to AMD's Torrenza initiative, Intel opened its FSB CPU socket to third party devices. Prior to this announcement, made in Spring 2007 at Intel Developer Forum in Beijing, Intel had very closely guarded who had access to the FSB, only allowing Intel processors in the CPU socket. The first example was field-programmable gate array (FPGA) co-processors, a result of collaboration between Intel-Xilinx-Nallatech and Intel-Altera-XtremeData (which shipped in 2008).

== Related component speeds ==
A typical chipset layout from the Pentium II/III era

=== CPU ===
The frequency at which a processor (CPU) operates is determined by applying a clock multiplier to the front-side bus (FSB) speed in some cases. For example, a processor running at 3200 MHz might be using a 400 MHz FSB. This means there is an internal clock multiplier setting (also called bus/core ratio) of 8. That is, the CPU is set to run at 8 times the frequency of the front-side bus: 400 MHz × 8 = 3200 MHz. Different CPU speeds are achieved by varying either the FSB frequency or the CPU multiplier, this is referred to as overclocking or underclocking.

=== Memory ===
Setting an FSB speed is related directly to the speed grade of memory a system must use. The memory bus connects the northbridge and RAM, just as the front-side bus connects the CPU and northbridge. Often, these two buses must operate at the same frequency. Increasing the front-side bus to 450 MHz in most cases also means running the memory at 450 MHz.

In newer systems, it is possible to see memory ratios of "4:5" and the like. The memory will run 5/4 times as fast as the FSB in this situation, meaning a 400 MHz bus can run with the memory at 500 MHz. This is often referred to as an 'asynchronous' system. Due to differences in CPU and system architecture, overall system performance can vary in unexpected ways with different FSB-to-memory ratios.

In image, audio, video, gaming, FPGA synthesis and scientific applications that perform a small amount of work on each element of a large data set, FSB speed becomes a major performance issue. A slow FSB will cause the CPU to spend significant amounts of time waiting for data to arrive from system memory. However, if the computations involving each element are more complex, the processor will spend longer performing these; therefore, the FSB will be able to keep pace because the rate at which the memory is accessed is reduced.

=== Peripheral buses ===
Similar to the memory bus, the PCI and AGP buses can also be run asynchronously from the front-side bus. In older systems, these buses are operated at a set fraction of the front-side bus frequency. This fraction was set by the BIOS. In newer systems, the PCI, AGP, and PCI Express peripheral buses often receive their own clock signals, which eliminates their dependence on the front-side bus for timing.

=== Overclocking ===
Overclocking is the practice of making computer components operate beyond their stock performance levels by manipulating the frequencies at which the component is set to run, and, when necessary, modifying the voltage sent to the component to allow it to operate at these higher frequencies with more stability.

Many motherboards allow the user to manually set the clock multiplier and FSB settings by changing jumpers or BIOS settings. Almost all CPU manufacturers now "lock" a preset multiplier setting into the chip. It is possible to unlock some locked CPUs; for instance, some AMD Athlon processors can be unlocked by connecting electrical contacts across points on the CPU's surface. Some other processors from AMD and Intel are unlocked from the factory and labeled as an "enthusiast-grade" processors by end users and retailers because of this feature. For all processors, increasing the FSB speed can be done to boost processing speed by reducing latency between CPU and the northbridge.

This practice pushes components beyond their specifications and may cause erratic behavior, overheating or premature failure. Even if the computer appears to run normally, problems may appear under a heavy load. Most PCs purchased from retailers or manufacturers, such as Hewlett-Packard or Dell, do not allow the user to change the multiplier or FSB settings due to the probability of erratic behavior or failure. Motherboards purchased separately to build a custom machine are more likely to allow the user to edit the multiplier and FSB settings in the PC's BIOS.

== Evolution ==
The front-side bus had the advantage of high flexibility and low cost when it was first designed. Simple symmetric multiprocessors place a number of CPUs on a shared FSB, though performance could not scale linearly due to bandwidth bottlenecks.

The front-side bus was used in all Intel Atom, Celeron, Pentium, Core 2, and Xeon processor models through about 2008 and was eliminated in 2009. Originally, this bus was a central connecting point for all system devices and the CPU.

The potential of a faster CPU is wasted if it cannot fetch instructions and data as quickly as it can execute them. The CPU may spend significant time idle while waiting to read or write data in main memory, and high-performance processors therefore require high bandwidth and low latency access to memory. The front-side bus was criticized by AMD as being an old and slow technology that limits system performance.

More modern designs use point-to-point and serial connections like AMD's HyperTransport and Intel's DMI 2.0 or QuickPath Interconnect (QPI). These implementations remove the traditional northbridge in favor of a direct link from the CPU to the system memory, high-speed peripherals, and the Platform Controller Hub, southbridge or I/O controller.

In a traditional architecture, the front-side bus served as the immediate data link between the CPU and all other devices in the system, including main memory. In HyperTransport- and QPI-based systems, system memory is accessed independently by means of a memory controller integrated into the CPU, leaving the bandwidth on the HyperTransport or QPI link for other uses. This increases the complexity of the CPU design but offers greater throughput as well as superior scaling in multiprocessor systems.

== Transfer rates ==
The bandwidth or maximum theoretical throughput of the front-side bus is determined by the product of the width of its data path, its clock frequency (cycles per second) and the number of data transfers it performs per clock cycle. For example, a 64-bit (8-byte) wide FSB operating at a frequency of 100 MHz that performs 4 transfers per cycle has a bandwidth of 3200 megabytes per second (MB/s):

8 bytes/transfer × 100 MHz × 4 transfers/cycle = 3200 MB/s

The number of transfers per clock cycle depends on the technology used. For example, GTL+ performs 1 transfer/cycle, EV6 2 transfers/cycle, and AGTL+ 4 transfers/cycle. Intel calls the technique of four transfers per cycle Quad Pumping.

Many manufacturers publish the frequency of the front-side bus in MHz, but marketing materials often list the theoretical effective signaling rate (which is commonly called megatransfers per second or MT/s). For example, if a motherboard (or processor) has its bus set at 200 MHz and performs 4 transfers per clock cycle, the FSB is rated at 800 MT/s.

The specifications of several generations of popular processors are indicated below.

=== Intel processors ===
CPU	FSB frequency (MHz)	Transfers per cycle	Bus width	Transfer rate (MB/s)
Pentium	50–66	1	64-bit	400–528
Pentium Overdrive	25–66	1	32 or 64-bit	200–528
Pentium Pro	60 / 66	1	64-bit	480–528
Pentium MMX	60 / 66	1	64-bit	480–528
Pentium MMX Overdrive	50 / 60 / 66	1	64-bit	400–528
Pentium II	66 / 100	1	64-bit	528 / 800
Pentium II Xeon	100	1	64-bit	800
Pentium II Overdrive	60 / 66	1	64-bit	480–528
Pentium III	100 / 133	1	64-bit	800 / 1064
Pentium III Xeon	100 / 133	1	64-bit	800 / 1064
Pentium III-M	100 / 133	1	64-bit	800 / 1064
Pentium 4	100 / 133	4	64-bit	3200–4256
Pentium 4-M	100	4	64-bit	3200
Pentium 4 HT	133 / 200	4	64-bit	4256 / 6400
Pentium 4 HT Extreme Edition	200 / 266	4	64-bit	6400 / 8512
Pentium D	133 / 200	4	64-bit	4256–6400
Pentium Extreme Edition	200 / 266	4	64-bit	6400 / 8512
Pentium M	100 / 133	4	64-bit	3200 / 4256
Pentium Dual-Core	200 / 266	4	64-bit	6400 / 8512
Pentium Dual-Core Mobile	133–200	4	64-bit	6400–8512
Celeron	66–200	1–4	64-bit	528–6400
Celeron Mobile	133–200	1–4	64-bit	4256–6400
Celeron D	133	4	64-bit	4256
Celeron M	66–200	1–4	64-bit	528–6400
Celeron Dual-Core	200	4	64-bit	6400
Celeron Dual-Core Mobile	133–200	4	64-bit	4256–6400
Itanium	133	2	64-bit	2133
Itanium 2	200–333	2	128-bit	6400–10666
Xeon	100–400	4	64-bit	3200–12800
Core Solo	133 / 166	4	64-bit	4256 / 5312
Core Duo	133 / 166	4	64-bit	4256 / 5312
Core 2 Solo	133–200	4	64-bit	4256–6400
Core 2 Duo	200–333	4	64-bit	6400–10656
Core 2 Duo Mobile	133–266	4	64-bit	4256–8512
Core 2 Quad	266 / 333	4	64-bit	8512 / 10656
Core 2 Quad Mobile	266	4	64-bit	8512
Core 2 Extreme	266–400	4	64-bit	8512–12800
Core 2 Extreme Mobile	200 / 266	4	64-bit	6400 / 8512
Atom	100–166	4	64-bit	3200–5312

=== AMD processors ===
CPU	FSB frequency (MHz)	Transfers per cycle	Bus width	Transfer rate (MB/s)
K5	50–66	1	64-bit	400–528
K6	66	1	64-bit	528
K6-II	66–100	1	64-bit	528–800
K6-III	66 / 100	1	64-bit	528–800
Athlon	100 / 133	2	64-bit	1600–2128
Athlon XP	100 / 133 / 166 / 200	2	64-bit	1600–3200
Athlon MP	100 / 133	2	64-bit	1600–2128
Mobile Athlon 4	100	2	64-bit	1600
Athlon XP-M	100 / 133	2	64-bit	1600–2128
Duron	100 / 133	2	64-bit	1600–2128
Sempron	166 / 200	2	64-bit	2656–3200
