= PSGA =

PSGA may refer to:

- Puneet Shikha Gupta & Associates, Chartered Accountants in Delhi, India
- Pedal Steel Guitar Association, United States association
- Polymer Stud Grid Array, a chip scale package
