= Slot 1 =

CPU socket for old Intel CPUs

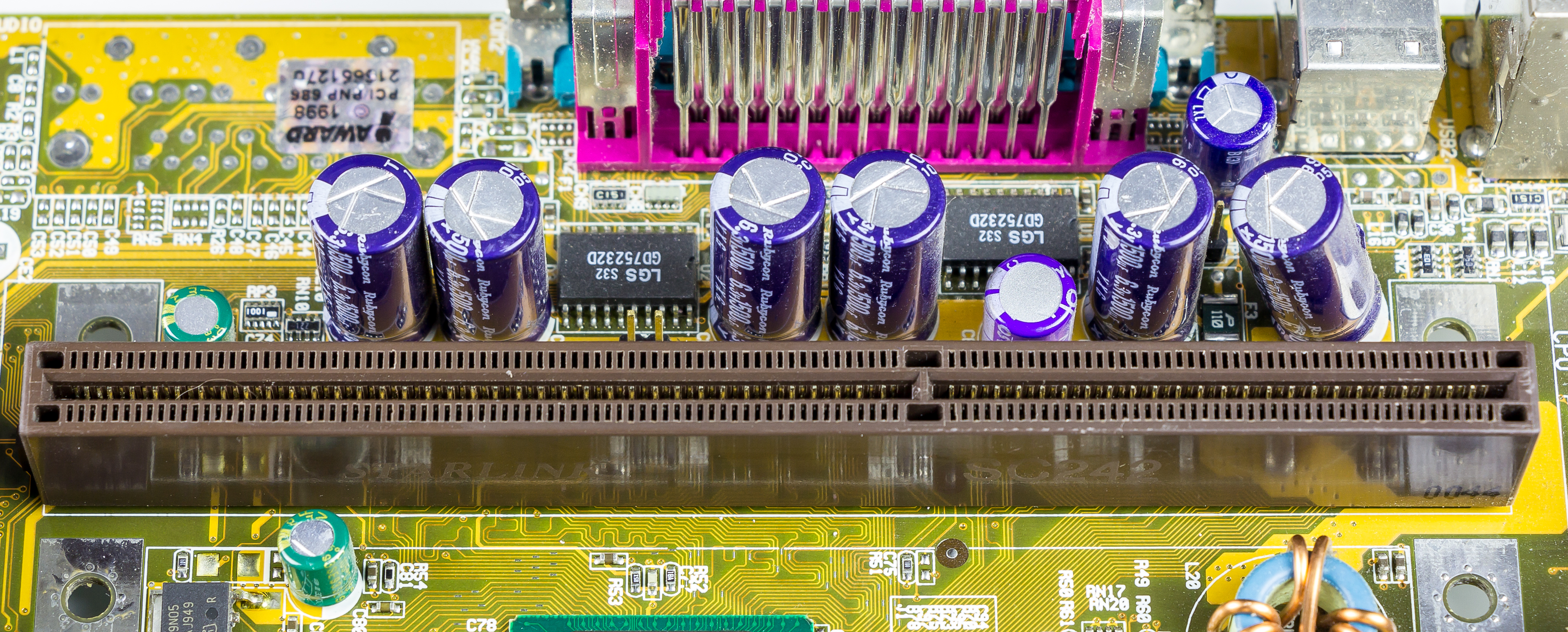
- Type: Slot
- Chip form factors: Single Edge Contact Cartridge (Pentium II); Single Edge Contact Cartridge 2 (Pentium II, Pentium III); Single Edge Processor Package (Celeron)
- Contacts: 242
- FSB protocol: AGTL+
- FSB frequency: 66, 100, and (on third-party chipsets) 133 MHz
- Voltage range: 1.3 to 3.50 V
- Processors: Pentium II: 233–450 MHz Celeron: 266–433 MHz; Pentium III: 450 MHz–1.13 GHz (A Slotket makes following Socket 370 CPUs usable: Celeron and Pentium III to 1,400 MHz, VIA Cyrix III: 350–733 MHz, VIA C3: 733–1,200 MHz Slotkets also made it possible to use some Pentium Pro CPUs for Socket 8 using the same method.)
- Predecessor: Socket 7
- Successor: Socket 370
- This article is part of the CPU socket series

Slot 1 refers to the physical and electrical specification for the connector used by some of Intel's P6 microarchitecture processors, including the Pentium Pro, Celeron, Pentium II and the Pentium III and marked the beginning of AwardBIOS v6.00PG with support on some later boards. Both single and dual processor configurations were implemented.

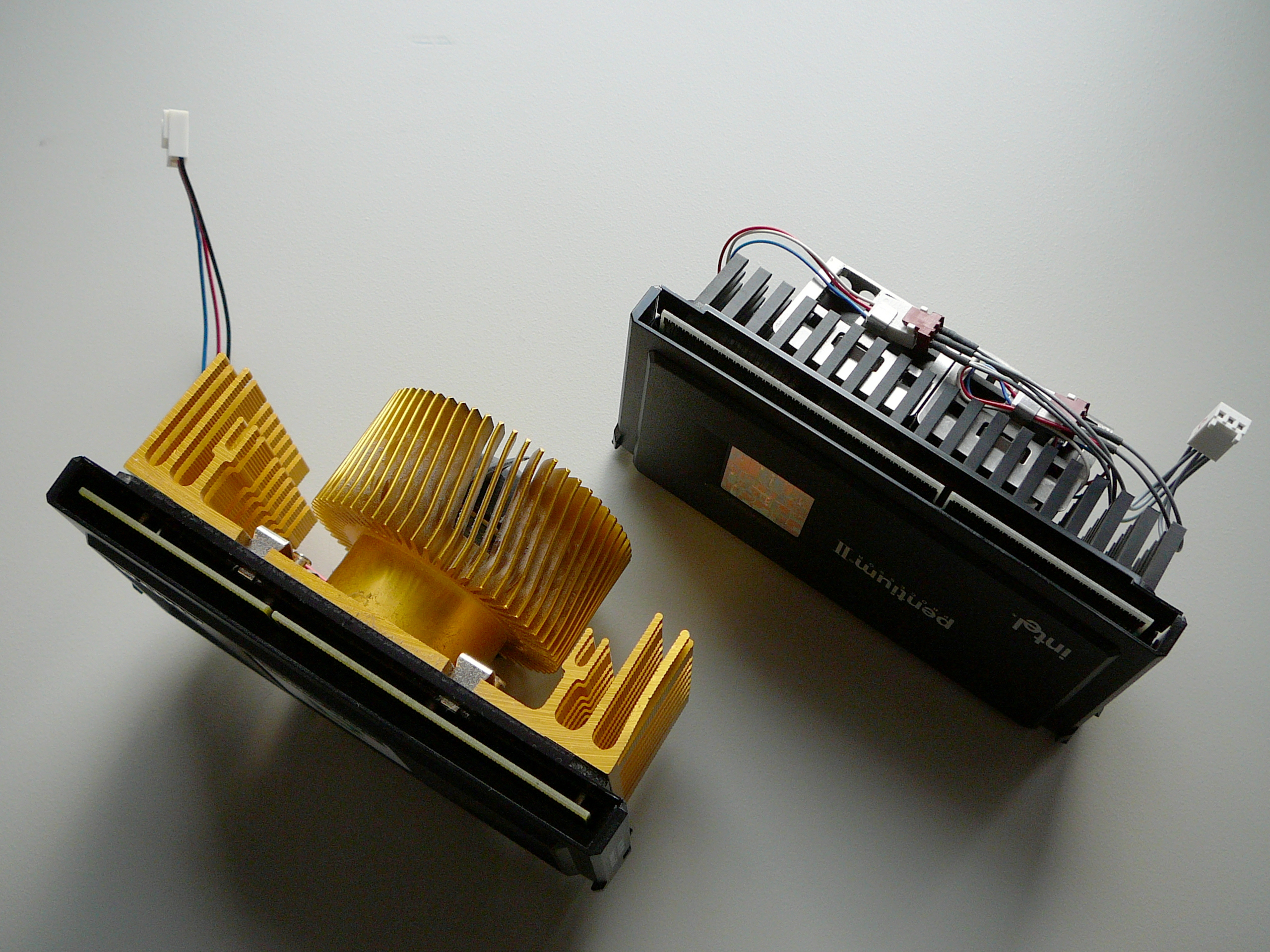
A Slot A CPU on the left compared to a Slot 1 CPU (connector rotated by 180 degrees)

The form factor used for Slot 1 was a 5-inch-long, 242-contact edge connector named SC242. To prevent the cartridge from being inserted the wrong way, the slot was keyed to allow installation in only one direction. SC242 was also used for AMD's Slot A for early versions of their Athlon CPUs, though while the two slots were identical mechanically, they were electrically incompatible. To discourage Slot A users from accidentally installing a Slot 1 CPU on a Slot A motherboard, the connector was rotated 180 degrees. This also allowed motherboard manufacturers to save costs by stocking the same part for both Slot 1 and Slot A assemblies.

Intel went back into using a traditional socket interface with Socket 370 in 1999.

== General ==
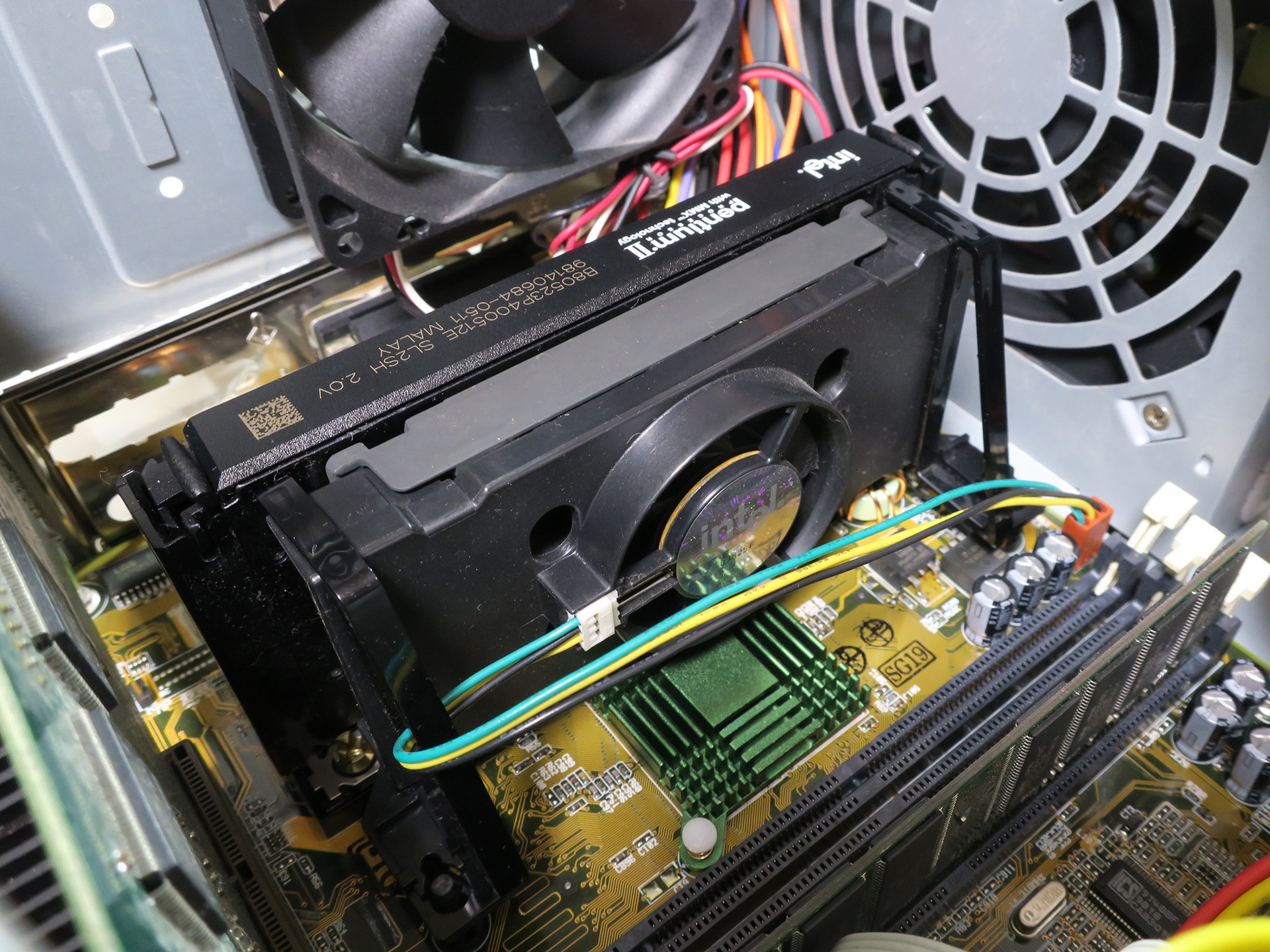
Pentium II SECC form installed into Slot 1

With the introduction of the Pentium II CPU, the need for greater access for testing had made the transition from socket to slot necessary. Previously with the Pentium Pro, Intel had combined processor and cache dies in the same Socket 8 package. These were connected by a full-speed bus, resulting in significant performance benefits. Unfortunately, this method required that the two components be bonded together early in the production process, before testing was possible. As a result, a single, tiny flaw in either die made it necessary to discard the entire assembly, causing low production yield and high cost.

Intel subsequently designed a circuit board where the CPU and cache remained closely integrated, but were mounted on a printed circuit board, called a Single-Edged Contact Cartridge (SECC). The CPU and cache could be tested separately, before final assembly into a package, reducing cost and making the CPU more attractive to markets other than that of high-end servers. These cards could also be easily plugged into a Slot 1, thereby eliminating the chance for pins of a typical CPU to be bent or broken when installing in a socket.

With the new Slot 1, Intel added support for symmetric multiprocessing (SMP). A maximum of two Pentium II or Pentium III CPUs can be used in a dual slot motherboard. The Celeron does not have official SMP support.

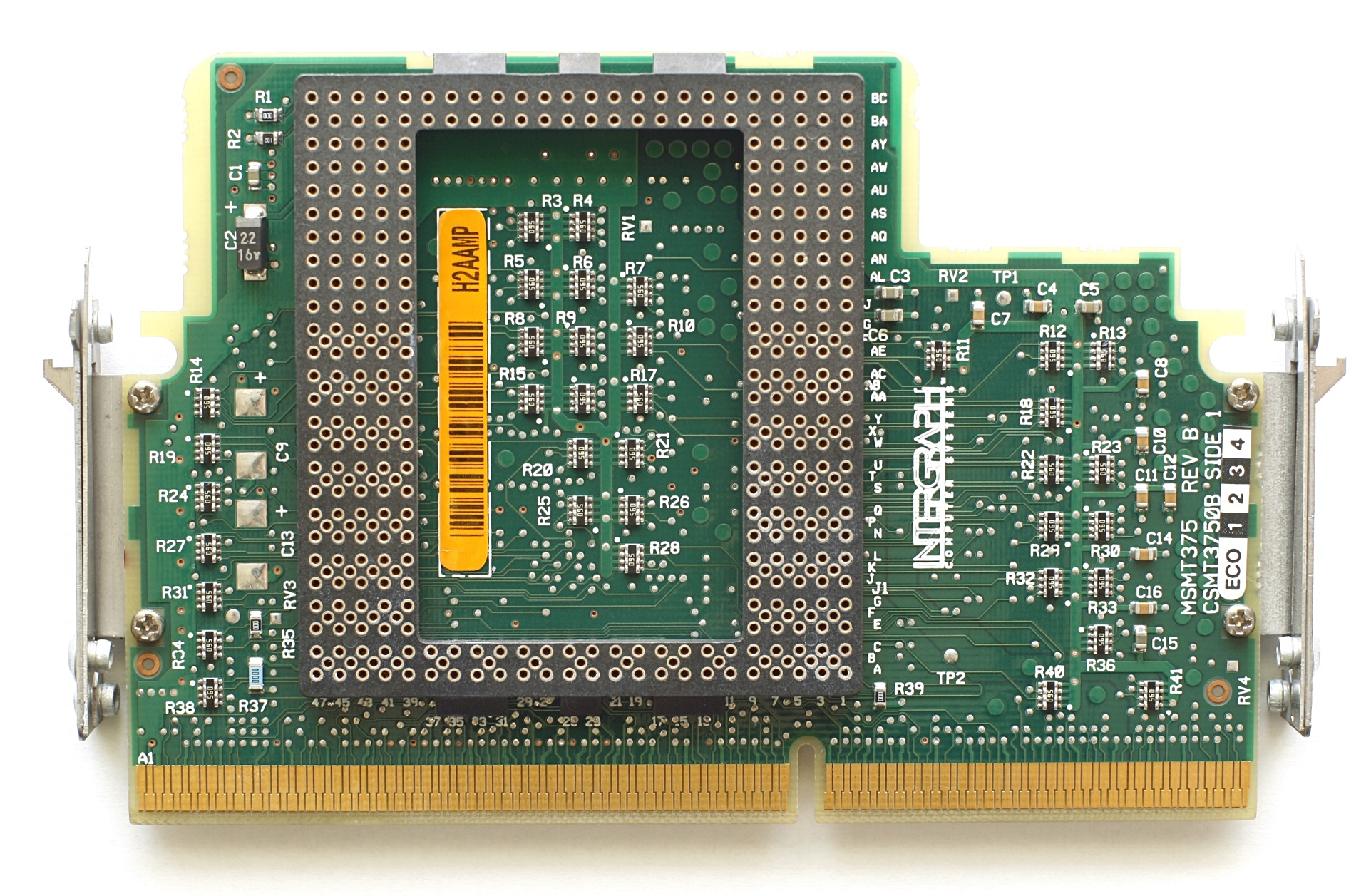
Slot 1/Socket 8 Converter

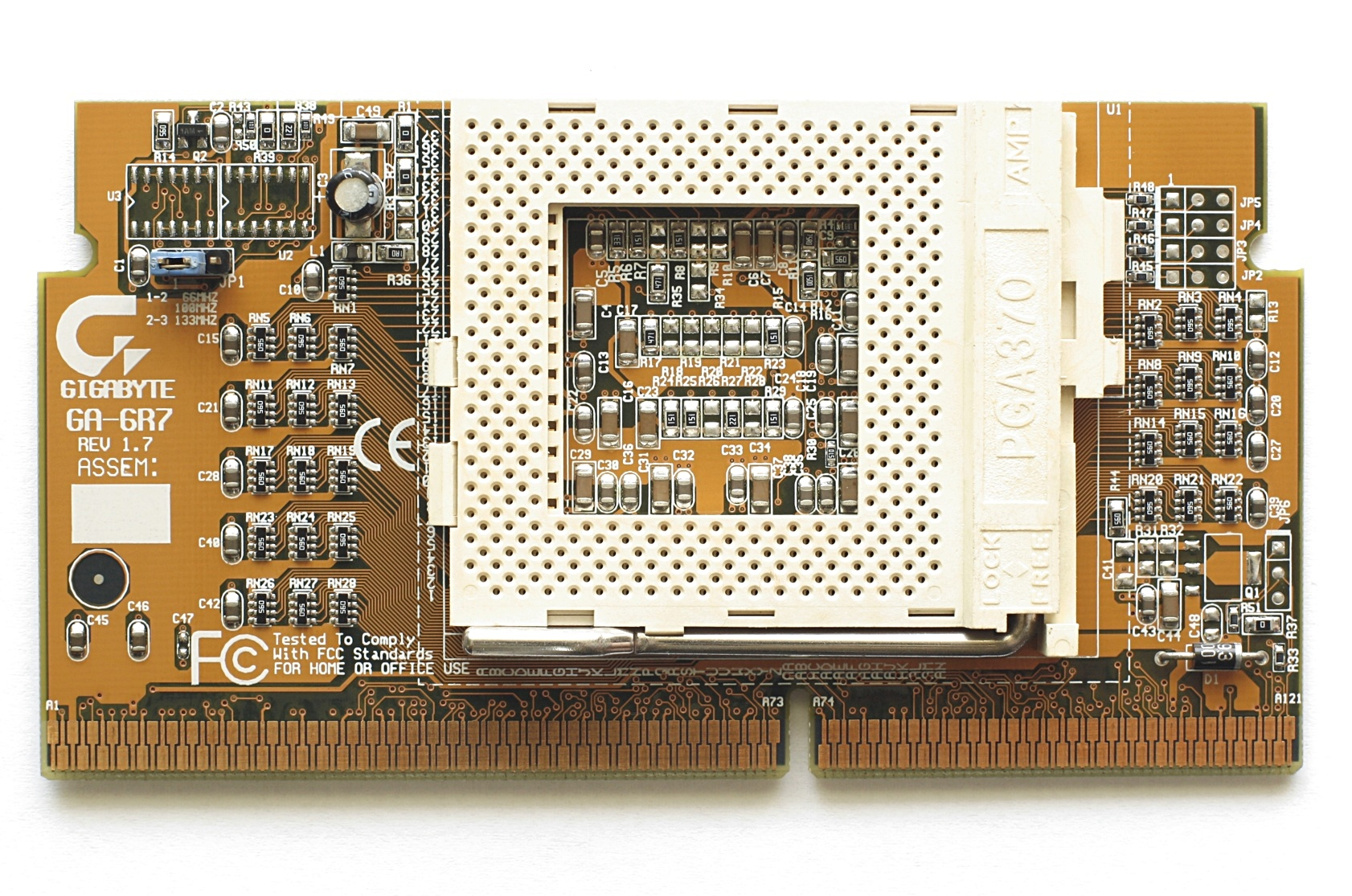
Slot 1/Socket 370 Converter

There are also converter cards, known as Slotkets, which can allow a socketed CPU to be used on a Slot 1 motherboard. One type of slotket allowed for Socket 8 CPUs to be used with Slot 1 motherboards. These specific converters, however, are rare. Another kind of slotket allows using a Socket 370 CPU in a Slot 1. These are generally more common than Socket 8 to Slot 1 slotkets, and allowed for CPU upgrades well past the existing Slot 1 CPUs. Many of these latter devices are equipped with their own voltage regulator modules, in order to supply the new CPU with a lower core voltage, which the motherboard would not otherwise allow.

== History ==
Historically, there are three platforms for the Intel P6 CPUs: Socket 8, Slot 1 and Socket 370.

Slot 1 is a successor to Socket 8. While the Socket 8 CPUs (Pentium Pro) directly had the L2-cache embedded into the CPU, it is located (outside of the core) on a circuit board shared with the core itself. The exception is later Slot 1 CPUs with the Coppermine core which have the L2-cache embedded into the die.

In the beginning of 2000, around the time the Coppermine Pentium III CPUs with FC-PGA housing were already commonplace, Slot 1 was being gradually phased out in favor of Socket 370, well after Intel started to offer both Socket 370 and Slot 1 CPUs at the same time since late 1998. Socket 370 was initially made for low-cost Celeron processors starting with the Mendocino Celerons, while Slot 1 was thought of as a platform for the more expensive Pentium II and early Pentium III models. Both cache and core were embedded into the die.

Slot 1 also obsoleted the old Socket 7 as the standard platform for home users, at least regarding Intel. After superseding the Intel P5 Pentium MMX CPU in the late 1990s, Intel had completely left the Socket 7 market.

== Form factors ==
There were three main form factors for Slot 1 CPUs: Single Edge Contact Cartridge (SECC), Single Edge Processor Package (SEPP), and Single Edge Contact Cartridge 2 (SECC2).

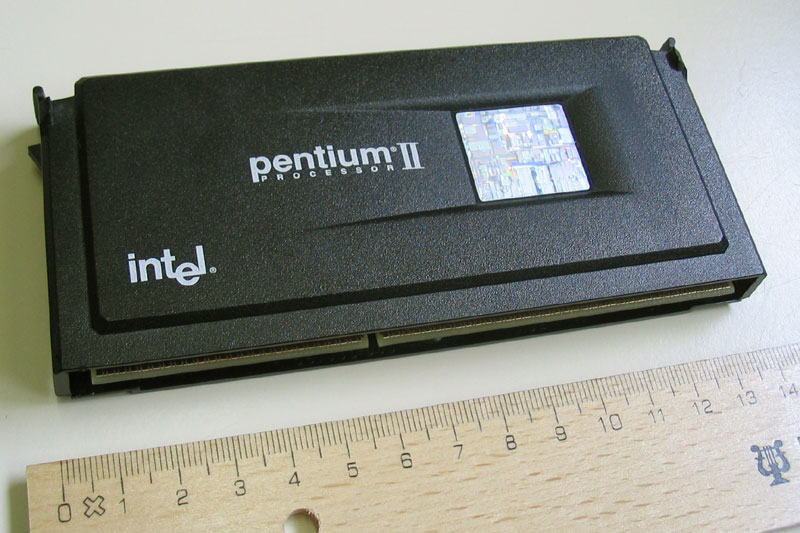
Intel Pentium II CPU in SECC form factor

The Single Edge Contact Cartridge, or "SECC", was used at the beginning of the Slot 1-era for Pentium II CPUs. Inside the cartridge, the CPU itself is enclosed in a hybrid plastic and metal case. The back of the housing is plastic and has several markings on it: the name, "Pentium II"; the Intel logo; a hologram; and the model number. The front consists of a black anodized aluminum plate, which is used to hold the CPU cooler. The SECC form is very solid, because the CPU itself is resting safely inside the case. Compared to socket-based CPUs, there are no pins that can be bent, and the CPU is less likely to be damaged by improper installation of a cooler.

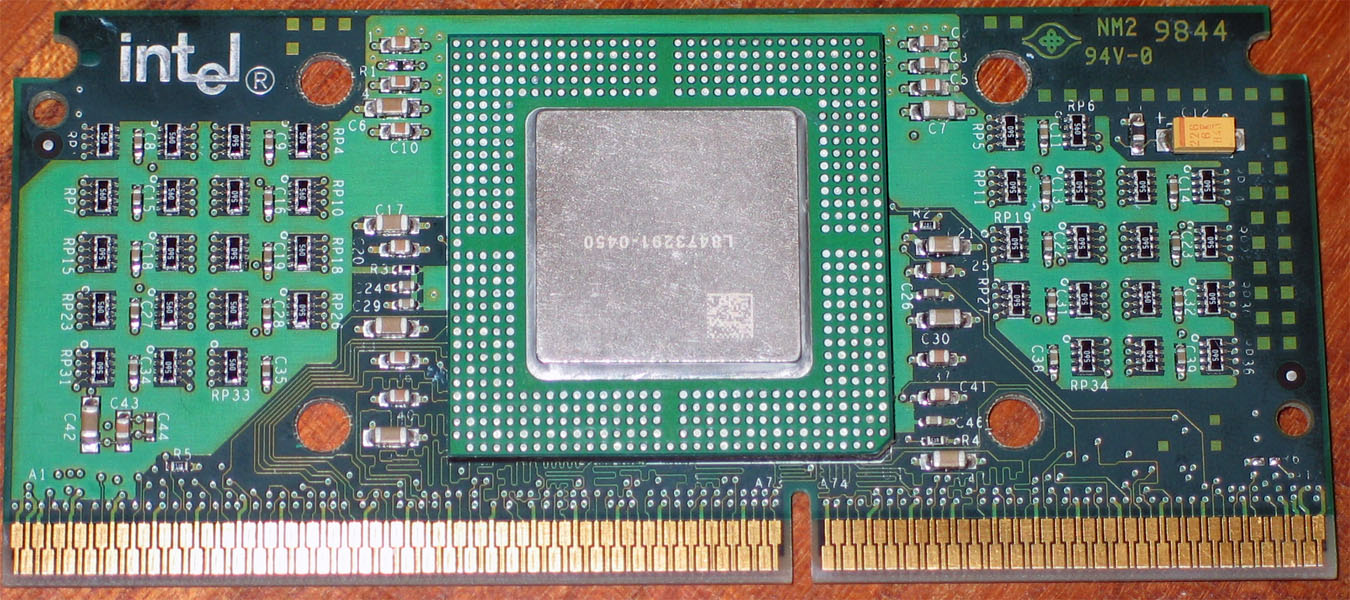
Celeron in SEPP: CPU at center (under heat spreader), surrounding chips are resistors and bypass capacitors

Following the SECC, the SEPP (Single Edge Processor Package) appeared on the market. This form lacks a case entirely, consisting solely of a bare PCB holding the components. It was designed for lower-priced Celeron CPUs.

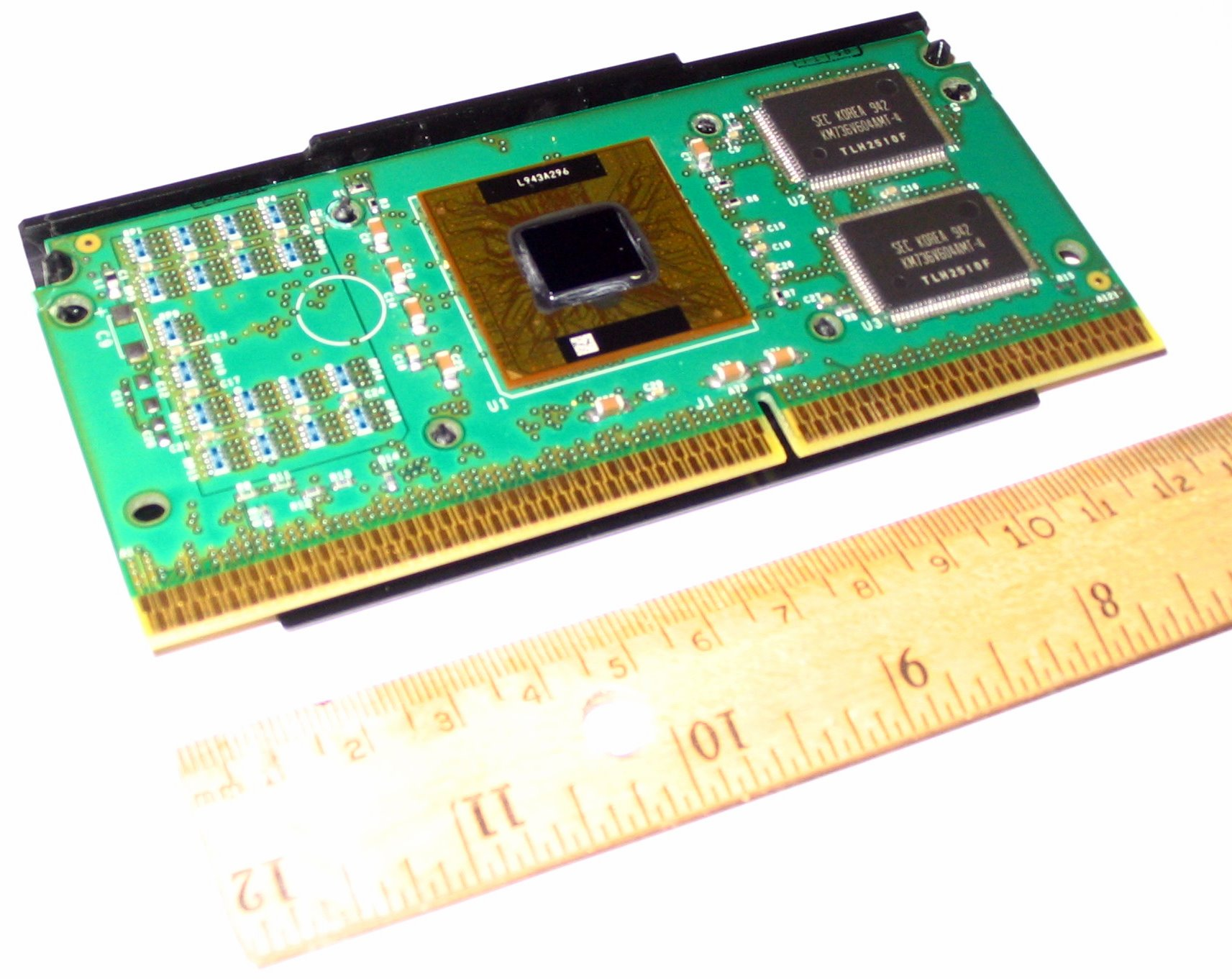
Pentium III (Katmai) in SECC2: CPU at center, two chips at right are cache

A form factor called SECC2 (Single Edge Contact Cartridge 2) was used for late Pentium II and Pentium III CPUs for Slot 1, which was created to accommodate the switch to flip chip packaging. Only the front plate was carried over; the coolers were now mounted straight to the PCB and exposed CPU die and are, as such, incompatible with SECC cartridges.

== Chipsets and officially supported CPUs ==
=== Intel 440FX ===
- Introduced in: May 6, 1996
- FSB: 66 MHz
- PIO/WDMA
- Supported RAM type: EDO-DRAM
- Supported CPUs:
  - Pentium Pro
  - Pentium II with 66 MHz FSB
  - Celeron (Covington, Mendocino)
- Used in both Socket 8 (Pentium Pro) and Slot 1 (Pentium II, early Celerons)
- Does not support AGP or SDRAM, as it predates the introduction of said technologies
- Allowed up to two CPUs for SMP

=== Intel 440LX ===
- Introduced in: August 27, 1997
- FSB: 66 MHz
- Supported RAM type: EDO-DRAM, SDRAM
- Supported CPUs: Pentium II, Celeron
- AGP 2× Mode
- UDMA/33
  - Pentium II with 66 MHz FSB
  - Celeron (Covington, Mendocino)
- Introduced support for AGP and SDRAM
- Allowed up to two CPUs for SMP

=== Intel 440EX ===
- Introduced in: April, 1998
- FSB: 66 MHz
- Supported RAM type: EDO-DRAM, SDRAM
- Supported CPUs: Pentium II, Celeron
- AGP 2× Mode
- UDMA/33
  - Pentium II with 66 MHz FSB
  - Celeron (Covington, Mendocino)
- Same specifications as 440LX, but memory support limited to 256 MB and no SMP support.

=== Intel 440BX ===
- Introduced in: April 1998
- FSB: 66 and 100 MHz (some motherboards supported overclocking to 133 MHz, allowing usage of Socket 370 CPUs using a Slocket)
- AGP 2× Mode (max aperture size 32 or 64 MB)
- UDMA/33
- Supported RAM types: SDRAM (PC66 and PC100, PC133 with overclocking) up to 4 DIMMs of 256 MB
- Supported CPUs:
  - Pentium II with 66 and 100 MHz FSB
  - Pentium III with 100 MHz FSB (133 with overclocking)
  - Celeron (Covington, Mendocino, Coppermine)
- Allowed up to two CPUs for SMP

=== Intel 440ZX ===
- Introduced in: November 1998
- FSB: 66 and 100 MHz (some motherboards supported overclocking to 133 MHz, allowing usage of Socket 370 CPUs using a Slocket)
- AGP 2× Mode
- UDMA/33
- Supported RAM types: SDRAM (PC66 and PC100, PC133 with overclocking), up to 2 DIMMs of 256 MB
- Supported CPUs:
  - Pentium II with 66 and 100 MHz FSB
  - Pentium III with 100 MHz FSB (133 with overclocking)
  - Celeron (Covington, Mendocino, Coppermine)

=== Intel 810 ===
- Introduced in: 1999
- FSB: 66 and 100 MHz
- No external AGP
- Intel i752 based graphics
- UDMA/66 (UDMA/33 with ICH0)
- Supported RAM types: PC100 SDRAM
- Supported CPUs:
  - Pentium II with 66 and 100 MHz FSB
  - Pentium III with 100 MHz FSB (133 with overclocking)
  - Celeron (Covington, Mendocino, Coppermine)

=== Intel 820/820E (Camino) ===
- Introduced in: November 1999
- FSB: 100 and 133 MHz
- AGP 4× Mode
- UDMA/66 (i820), UDMA/100 (i820E)
- Supported RAM types: RDRAM, SDRAM (PC100 via MTH)
- Supported CPUs: All FSB 100/133 Slot 1 CPUs
- Allowed up to two CPUs for SMP

=== Intel 840 ===
- Introduced in: November 1999
- FSB: 100 and 133 MHz
- AGP 4× Mode
- UDMA/66 (i820), UDMA/100 (i820E)
- Supported RAM types: Dual Channel RDRAM, SDRAM (PC100 via MTH)
- Supported CPUs: All FSB 100/133 Slot 1 CPUs
- Allowed up to two CPUs for SMP

=== VIA Apollo Pro / Pro II / Pro+ ===
- Introduced in: May 1998 (Pro Plus: Dec 1998)
- FSB: 66, 100 MHz (some motherboards supported overclocking to 133 MHz, allowing usage of Socket 370 CPUs using a Slocket)
- AGP 2× Mode
- UDMA/33 (VT82C586B/VT82C596A), UDMA/66 (VT82C596B)
- Supported RAM types: PC66/100 SDRAM up to 1536 MB
- Supported CPUs:
  - Pentium Pro with 66 MHz FSB
  - Pentium II with 66 and 100 MHz FSB
  - Pentium III with 100 MHz FSB (133 with overclocking)
  - Celeron (Covington, Mendocino, Coppermine)

=== VIA Apollo Pro 133 ===
- Introduced in: July 1999
- FSB: 66, 100, and 133 MHz
- AGP 2× Mode
- UDMA/33 (VT82C596A), UDMA/66 (VT82C596B/VT82C686A), UDMA/100 (VT82C686B)
- Supported RAM types: PC66/100/133 SDRAM up to 1536 MB
- Supported CPUs: All Slot 1 CPUs

=== VIA Apollo Pro 133A ===
- Introduced in: Oct 1999
- FSB: 66, 100, and 133 MHz
- AGP 4× Mode
- UDMA/66 (VT82C596B/VT82C686A), UDMA/100 (VT82C686B)
- Supported RAM types: PC66/100/133 SDRAM up to 2048 MB
- Supported CPUs: All Slot 1 CPUs
- Allowed up to two CPUs for SMP

=== SiS 5600 (SiS 600) ===
- Introduced in: November 1998
- FSB: 66 and 100 MHz
- AGP 2× Mode
- UDMA/33
- Supported RAM types: PC66/100 SDRAM up to 1536 MB
- Supported CPUs:
  - Pentium II with 66 and 100 MHz FSB
  - Pentium III with 100 MHz FSB
  - Celeron (Covington, Mendocino, Coppermine)

=== SiS 620 ===
- Introduced in: April 1999
- FSB: 66 and 100 MHz
- No external AGP port
- SiS 6326 based Integrated Graphics
- UDMA/33
- Supported RAM types: PC66/100 SDRAM up to 1536 MB
- Supported CPUs:
  - Pentium II with 66 and 100 MHz FSB
  - Pentium III with 100 MHz FSB
  - Celeron (Covington, Mendocino, Coppermine)

== See also ==
- Slot A
- Slot 2
- List of Intel microprocessors
- Slotket
