= Slotket =

Microprocessor adapter

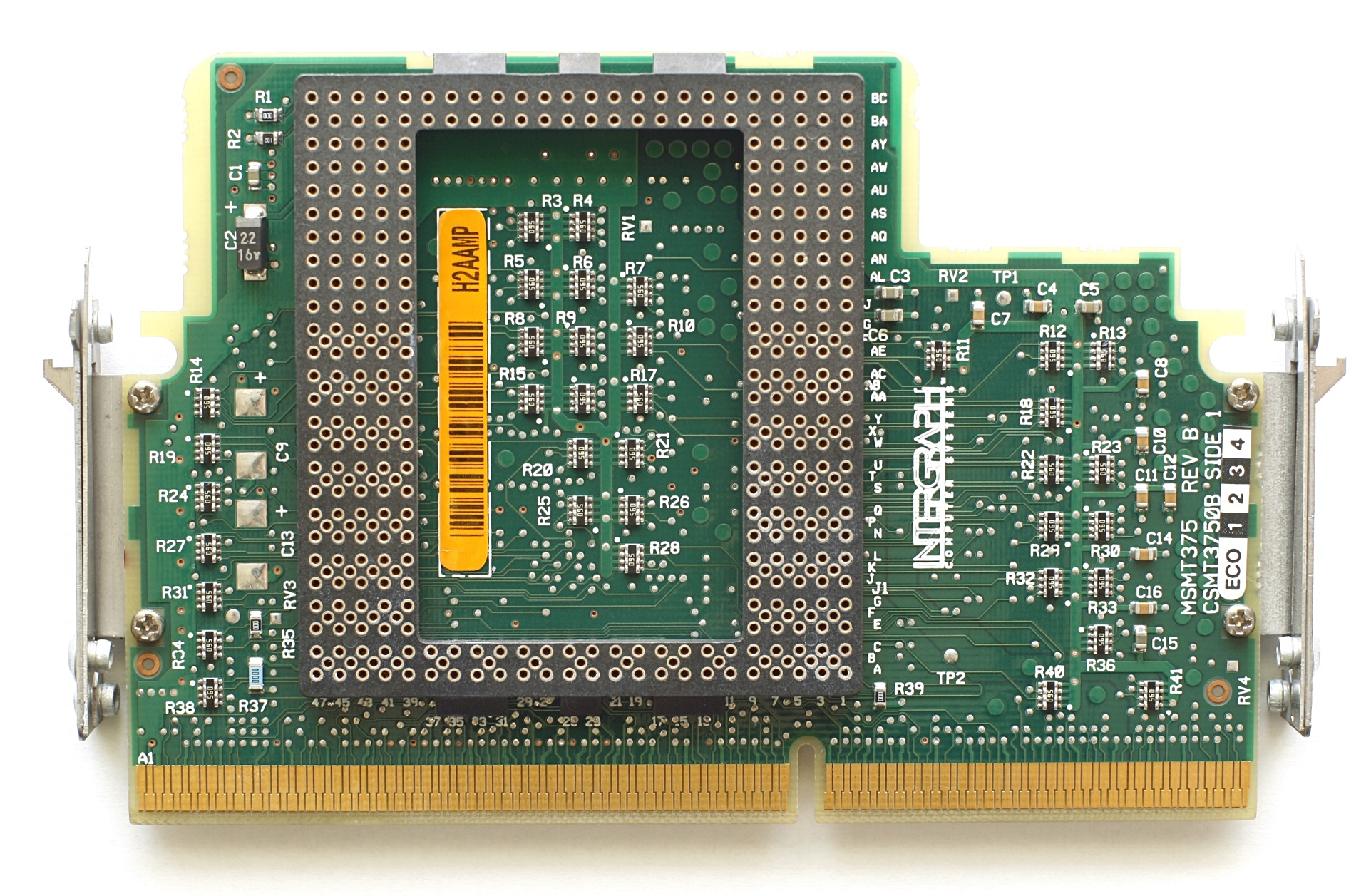
Socket 8 slocket adapter

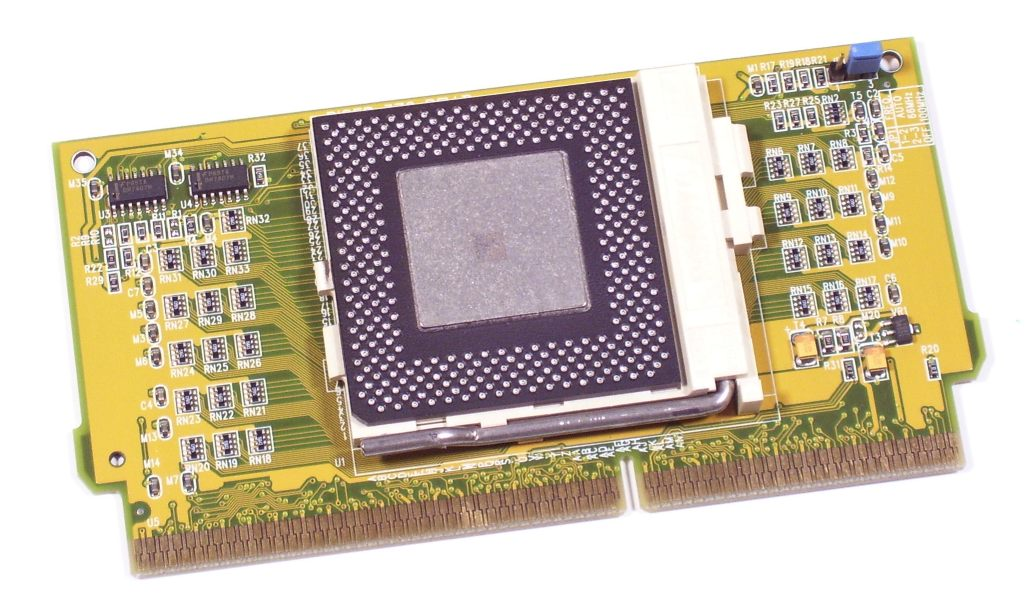
Socket 370 slotket adapter

In computer hardware terminology, slotkets, also known as slockets, (both short for slot to socket adapter) are adapters that allow socket-based microprocessors to be used on slot-based motherboards.

Slotkets were first created to allow the use of Socket 8 Pentium Pro processors on Slot 1 motherboards. However, only a few number of chipsets supported these slotkets, and so did not see widespread use. Later, they became more popular for inserting Socket 370 Intel Celerons into Slot 1 based motherboards. This lowered costs for computer builders, especially with dual processor machines. High-end motherboards accepting two Slot 1 processors (usually Pentium II) were widely available, but double-socketed motherboards for the less expensive Socket 370 Celerons were not (with a few exceptions). The slotkets remained popular in the transition period from Slot to Socket-based Pentium III processors by allowing CPU upgrades in existing Slot 1 motherboards.

Slotkets were never introduced to take advantage of the AMD Athlon processors' transition from the Slot A form factor to the Socket A form factor. Additionally, adapters that go the other way around (from socket-based motherboards to slot-based CPUs) were also never introduced, especially since Socket 8 based motherboards do not support the higher clock frequencies of Slot 1 based processors.

As of September 2007, slotkets have largely disappeared, as Intel and AMD have not manufactured CPUs in slot form factors since 1999.

== See also ==
- CPU socket
