= Pentium Pro =

Sixth-generation x86 microprocessor by Intel

General information
- Launched: November 1, 1995 (31 years ago)
- Discontinued: 1998
- Marketed by: Intel
- Designed by: Intel
- Common manufacturer: Intel
- CPUID code: 0F619h
- Product code: 80521

Performance
- Max. CPU clock rate: 150 MHz to 200 MHz
- FSB speeds: 60 MT/s to 66 MT/s
- Data width: 64 bits
- Address width: 36 bits
- Virtual address width: 32 bits

Physical specifications
- Transistors: 5.5 million
- Cores: 1
- Socket: Socket 8

Cache
- L1 cache: 16 KB (8 KB instructions + 8 KB data)
- L2 cache: 256 KB – 1 MB

Architecture and classification
- Application: Server; Workstation
- Technology node: 500 nm to 350 nm
- Microarchitecture: P6
- Instruction set: x86

History
- Predecessor: Pentium
- Successors: Pentium II, Pentium II Xeon

Support status
- Unsupported

The Pentium Pro is the first sixth-generation x86-based microprocessor developed and manufactured by Intel and introduced on November 1, 1995. It was the second Intel processor to bear the name Pentium, and the first x86-based Intel processor to implement the P6 microarchitecture (sometimes termed i686), itself being the successor to the P5 architecture of the original Pentium.

While the Pentium and Pentium MMX had 3.1 and 4.5 million transistors, respectively, the Pentium Pro contained 5.5 million transistors. It was capable of both dual- and quad-processor configurations and only came in one form factor, the relatively large rectangular Socket 8.

The Pentium Pro was originally intended to replace the original Pentium (P5) in a full range of applications. Later, it was reduced to a more narrow role as a server and high-end desktop processor. Its role was later expanded to include supercomputers powered by the processors; the most notable being ASCI Red in 1996, which was the first computer to reach over one teraFLOPS and held the number one spot in the TOP500 list from 1997 to 2000. ASCI Red used a dual-processor configuration with two Pentium Pro CPUs on each computing node.

The successor to the Pentium Pro is the Pentium II Xeon in 1998 which in turn is also derived from P6.

== Microarchitecture ==
Block Diagram of the Pentium Pro's Microarchitecture

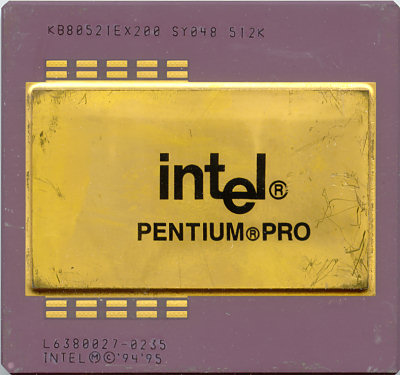
200 MHz Pentium Pro with a 512 KB L2 cache in PGA package

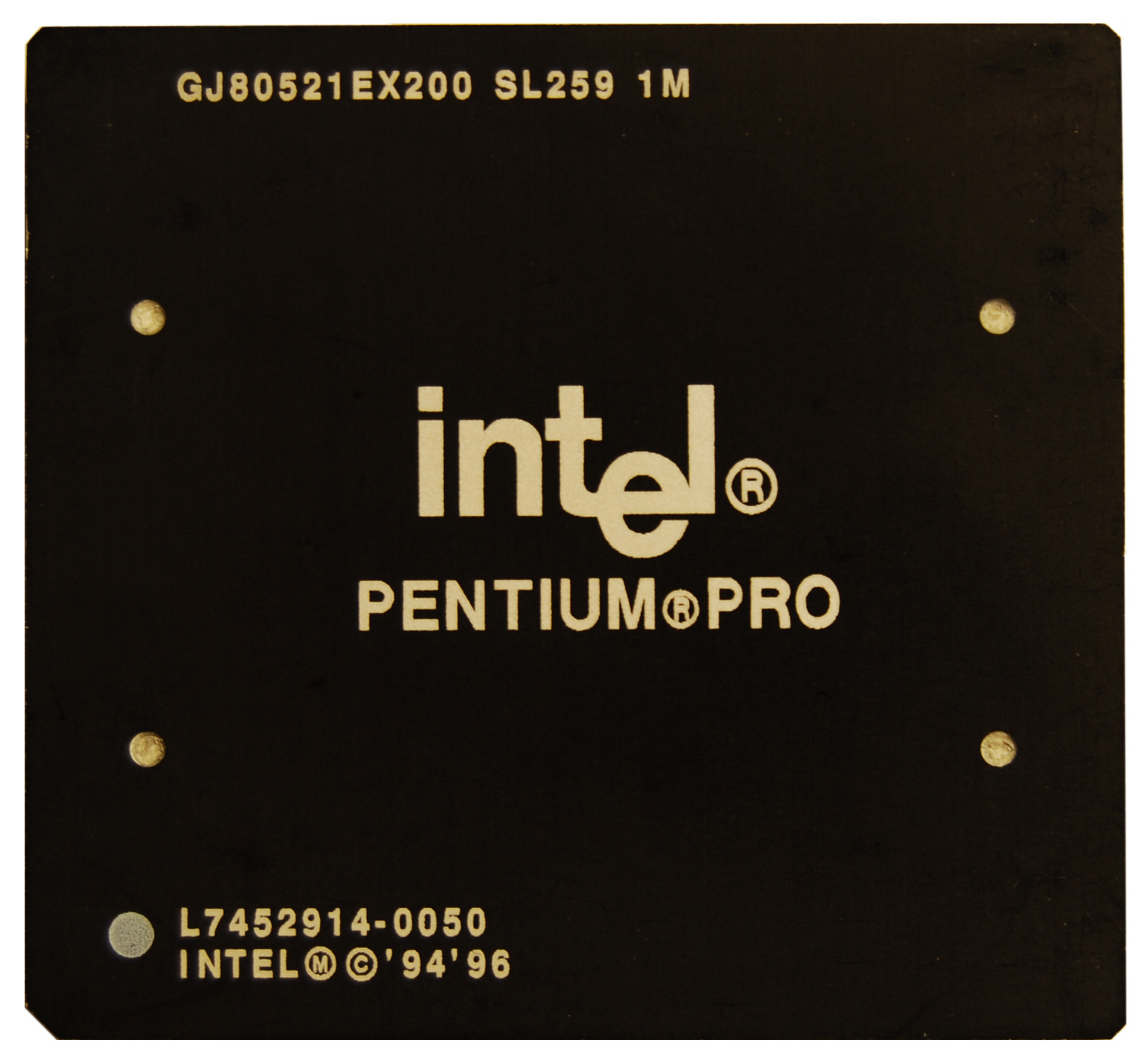
200 MHz Pentium Pro with a 1 MB L2 cache in PPGA package

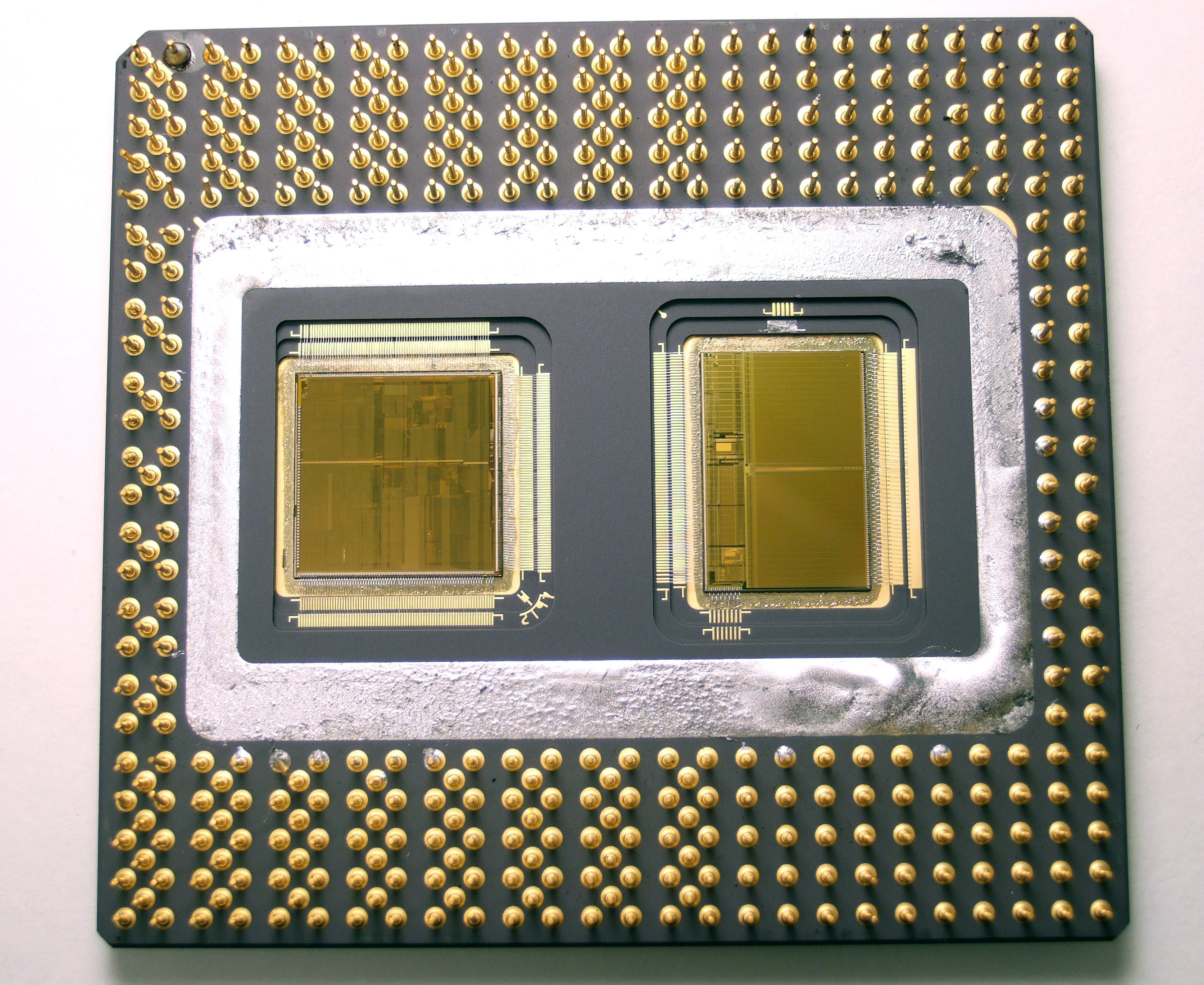
Decapped Pentium Pro 256 KB

The lead architect of Pentium Pro was Fred Pollack who was specialized in superscalarity and had also worked as the lead engineer of the Intel iAPX 432.

=== Summary ===
The Pentium Pro incorporated a new microarchitecture, different from the Pentium's P5 microarchitecture. It has a decoupled, 14-stage superpipelined architecture which used an instruction pool. The Pentium Pro (P6) implemented many radical architectural differences mirroring other contemporary x86 designs such as the NexGen Nx586 and Cyrix 6x86. The Pentium Pro pipeline had extra decode stages to dynamically translate IA-32 instructions into buffered micro-operation sequences which could then be analysed, reordered, and renamed in order to detect parallelizable operations that may be issued to more than one execution unit at once. The Pentium Pro thus featured out-of-order execution, including speculative execution via register renaming. It also had a wider 36-bit address bus, usable by Physical Address Extension (PAE), allowing it to access up to 64 GB (64 × 1024^{3} bytes) of memory.

The Pentium Pro has an 8 KB instruction cache, from which up to 16 bytes are fetched on each cycle and sent to the instruction decoders. There are three instruction decoders. The decoders are unequal in ability: only one can decode any x86 instruction, while the other two can only decode simple x86 instructions. This restricts the Pentium Pro's ability to decode multiple instructions simultaneously, limiting superscalar execution. x86 instructions are decoded into 118-bit micro-operations (micro-ops). The micro-ops are reduced instruction set computer (RISC)-like; that is, they encode an operation, two sources, and a destination. The general decoder can generate up to four micro-ops per cycle, whereas the simple decoders can generate one micro-op each per cycle. Thus, x86 instructions that operate on the memory (e.g., add this register to this location in the memory) can only be processed by the general decoder, as this operation requires a minimum of three micro-ops. Likewise, the simple decoders are limited to instructions that can be translated into one micro-op. Instructions that require more micro-ops than four are translated with the assistance of a sequencer, which generates the required micro-ops over multiple clock cycles. The Pentium Pro was the first processor in the x86 family to support upgradeable microcode under BIOS and/or operating system (OS) control.

Micro-ops exit the re-order buffer (ROB) and enter a reservation station (RS), where they await dispatch to the execution units. In each clock cycle, up to five micro-ops can be dispatched to five execution units. The Pentium Pro has a total of six execution units: two integer units, one floating-point unit (FPU), a load unit, store address unit, and a store data unit. One of the integer units shares the same ports as the FPU, and therefore the Pentium Pro can only dispatch one integer micro-op and one floating-point micro-op, or two integer micro-ops per a cycle, in addition to micro-ops for the other three execution units. Of the two integer units, only the one that shares the path with the FPU on port 0 has the full complement of functions such as a barrel shifter, multiplier, divider, and support for LEA instructions. The second integer unit, which is connected to port 1, does not have these facilities and is limited to simple operations such as add, subtract, and the calculation of branch target addresses.

The FPU executes floating-point operations. Addition and multiplication are pipelined and have a latency of three and five cycles, respectively. Division and square-root are not pipelined and are executed in separate units that share the FPU's ports. Division and square root have a latency of 18-36 and 29-69 cycles, respectively. The smallest number is for single precision (32-bit) floating-point numbers and the largest for extended precision (80-bit) numbers. Division and square root can operate simultaneously with adds and multiplies, preventing them from executing only when the result has to be stored in the ROB.

After the microprocessor was released, a bug was discovered in the floating point unit, commonly called the "Pentium Pro and Pentium II FPU bug" and by Intel as the "flag erratum". The bug occurs under some circumstances during floating point-to-integer conversion when the floating point number will not fit into the smaller integer format, causing the FPU to deviate from its documented behaviour. The bug is considered to be minor and occurs under such special circumstances that very few, if any, software programs are affected.

The Pentium Pro P6 microarchitecture was used in one form or another by Intel for more than a decade. The pipeline would scale from its initial 150 MHz start, all the way up to 1.4 GHz with the "Tualatin" Pentium III. The design's various traits would continue after that in the derivative core called "Banias" in Pentium M and Intel Core (Yonah), which itself would evolve into the Core microarchitecture (Core 2 processor) in 2006 and onward.

=== Instruction set ===
The Pentium Pro (P6) introduced new 'conditional move' instructions into the Intel range; the CMOVcc and FCMOVcc ('conditional move') instructions fetch a source value from a register or memory, and optionally write that value to a destination register according to a condition cc on the flags register, the same conditions used by the conditional jump (Jcc) instructions. For example, CMOVNE moves a specified value into a register if the flags register matches the NE (not-equal) condition, i.e. the zero flag is unset. If the zero flag is set, the condition in false, and the destination register keeps its value. This allows simple if-then-else operations (such as commonly used by the ? : operation in C) without a costly conditional branch. The FCMOVcc variant provides the same functionality for floating-point registers. Unfortunately, CMOV does not support immediate (in-line constant) source values nor memory destinations.

A second development was the documentation of the UD2 illegal instruction. This op code is reserved and guaranteed to cause an illegal instruction exception on the P6 and all later processors. This allows developers to easily crash the current program in a future-proof fashion when a bug is detected by software.

=== Performance ===
Despite being advanced for the time, the Pentium Pro's out-of-order register renaming architecture had trouble running 16-bit code and mixed code (8-bit with 16-bit (8/16), or 16-bit with 32-bit (16/32), as using partial registers caused frequent pipeline flushing. Specific use of partial registers was then a common performance optimization, as it incurred no performance penalty on pre-P6 Intel processors; also, the dominant operating systems at the time of the Pentium Pro's release were 16-bit MS-DOS, and mixed 16/32-bit Windows 3.1x and Windows 95 (although the latter requires a 32-bit 80386 CPU as a minimum, much of its code is still 16-bit for performance reasons, such as the 16-bit Windows USER dynamic link library, user.exe). This, along with the high cost of Pentium Pro systems, led to tepid sales among PC buyers at the time. To fully use the Pentium Pro's P6 microarchitecture, a fully 32-bit operating system is needed, such as Windows NT, Linux, Unix, or OS/2. The performance issues on legacy code were later partly mitigated by Intel with the Pentium II.

Compared to RISC microprocessors, the Pentium Pro, when introduced, slightly outperformed the fastest RISC microprocessors on integer performance when running the SPECint95 benchmark, but floating-point performance was significantly lower, half that of some RISC microprocessors. The Pentium Pro's integer performance lead disappeared rapidly, first overtaken by the MIPS Technologies R10000 in January 1996, and then by Digital Equipment Corporation's EV56 variant of the Alpha 21164.

Reviewers quickly noted the very slow writes to video memory as the weak spot of the P6 platform, with performance here being as low as 10% of an identically clocked Pentium system in benchmarks such as VIDSPEED. Methods to circumvent this included setting VESA drawing to system memory instead of video memory in games such as Quake, and later on utilities such as FASTVID emerged, which could double performance in certain games by enabling the write combining features of the CPU. Memory type range registers (MTRRs) are set automatically by Windows video drivers starting from 1997, and from there the improved cache/memory subsystem and FPU performance caused it to outclass the Pentium clock-for-clock in the emerging 3D games of the mid–to–late 1990s, particularly when using Windows NT 4.0. However, its lack of MMX implementation (which came out a year after the Pentium Pro's release) reduces performance in multimedia applications that made use of those instructions.

=== Caching ===
Likely Pentium Pro's most noticeable addition was its on-package L2 cache, which ranged from 256 KB at introduction to 1 MB in 1997. At the time, manufacturing technology did not feasibly allow a large L2 cache to be integrated into the processor core. Intel instead placed the L2 die(s) separately in the package which still allowed it to run at the same clock speed as the CPU core. Additionally, unlike most motherboard-based cache schemes that shared the main system bus with the CPU, the Pentium Pro's cache had its own back-side bus (called dual independent bus by Intel). Because of this, the CPU could read main memory and cache concurrently, greatly reducing a traditional bottleneck. The cache was also "non-blocking", meaning that the processor could issue more than one cache request at a time (up to 4), reducing cache-miss penalties; an example of memory-level parallelism (MLP). These properties combined to produce an L2 cache that was immensely faster than the motherboard-based caches of older processors. This cache alone gave the CPU an advantage in input/output performance over older x86 CPUs. In multiprocessor configurations, Pentium Pro's integrated cache skyrocketed performance in comparison to architectures which had each CPU sharing a central cache.

However, this far faster L2 cache did come with some complications. The Pentium Pro's "on-package cache" arrangement was unique. The processor and the cache were on separate dies in the same package and connected closely by a full-speed bus. The two or three dies had to be bonded together early in the production process, before testing was possible. This meant that a single, tiny flaw in either die made it necessary to discard the entire assembly, which was one of the reasons for the Pentium Pro's relatively low production yield and high cost. All versions of the chip were expensive, those with 1024 KB being particularly so, since it required two 512 KB cache dies as well as the processor die.

== Available models ==
Pentium Pro clock speeds were 150, 166, 180 or 200 MHz with a 60 or 66 MHz external bus clock. A prototype 133 MHz Pentium Pro was developed in its earliest stages of development but was never released. Some users chose to overclock their Pentium Pro chips, with the 200 MHz version often being run at 233 MHz, the 180 MHz version often being run at 200 MHz, and the 150 MHz version often being run at 166 MHz. The chip was popular in symmetric multiprocessing configurations, with dual and quad SMP server and workstation setups being commonplace.

The first computer system to ship with a Pentium Pro was released by Advanced Logic Research in April 1996 with the Revolution Quad6; as the name suggests, it supports up to four Pentium Pros running in a SMP configuration. Intel skipped out on providing a mobile version of the original Pentium Pro due to power draw and heat concerns. At least one vendor sold a portable computer with a Pentium Pro: Imperial Computer's 6200TLP.

In Intel's "Family/Model/Stepping" scheme, the Pentium Pro is family 6, model 1, and its Intel Product code is 80521.

Clock	Bus	L2-Cache	Max TDP
150 MHz	60 MHz	256 KB	29.2 W
166 MHz	66 MHz	512 KB	35.0 W
180 MHz	60 MHz	256 KB	31.7 W
200 MHz	66 MHz	256 KB	35.0 W
200 MHz	66 MHz	512 KB	37.9 W
200 MHz	66 MHz	1024 KB	44.0 W

== Fabrication ==
The process used to fabricate the Pentium Pro processor die and its separate cache memory die changed, leading to a combination of processes used in the same package:

- The 133 MHz Pentium Pro prototype processor die was fabricated in a 0.6 μm BiCMOS process.
- The 150 MHz Pentium Pro processor die was fabricated in a 0.50 μm BiCMOS process.
- The 166, 180, and 200 MHz Pentium Pro processor die was fabricated in a 0.35 μm BiCMOS process.
- The 256 KB L2 cache die was fabricated in a 0.50 μm BiCMOS process.
- The 512 and 1024 KB L2 cache die was fabricated in a 0.35 μm BiCMOS process.

== Packaging ==
The Pentium Pro (up to 512 KB cache) is packaged in a ceramic multi-chip module (MCM). The MCM has 387 pins, of which approximately half are arranged in a pin grid array (PGA) and half in an interstitial pin grid array (IPGA). The packaging was designed for Socket 8. The MCM contains two underside cavities in which the microprocessor die and its companion cache die reside. The dies are bonded to a heat slug, whose exposed top helps the heat from the dies to be transferred more directly to cooling apparatus such as a heat sink. The dies are connected to the package using conventional wire bonding. The cavities are capped with a ceramic plate. The Pentium Pro with 1 MB of cache uses a plastic MCM. Instead of two cavities, there is only one, in which the three dies reside, bonded to the package instead of a heat slug. The cavities are filled in with epoxy.

== Upgrade paths ==
In 1998, the 300/333 MHz Pentium II OverDrive processor for Socket 8 was released. Based on some of the technology used in the Deschutes Pentium II Xeon, it featured double L1 and 512 KB of full-speed L2 cache with MMX capabilities, and was produced by Intel as a drop-in upgrade option for owners of Pentium Pro systems. However, it only supported two-way glueless multiprocessing and not four-way or higher, which did not make it a usable upgrade for quad-processor systems. Despite this, some users have unofficially upgraded their quad- and even hexa-processor systems (especially the ALR 6x6) with varying degrees of success. The computing nodes of ASCI Red (which originally used Pentium Pro processors since its inception) were upgraded to these specially packaged processors in 1999, which maintained its lead in the TOP500 list (before being surpassed in 2000 by ASCI White) while also making it the first computer overall to exceed the two teraFLOPS performance mark that year. ASCI Red continued to use these processors for the remainder of its life until it was decommissioned in 2006.

As Slot 1 motherboards became prevalent, several manufacturers released slotket (or slocket) adapters in the form of Socket 8 to Slot 1 adapters, which includes the Tyan M2020, Asus C-P6S1, Tekram P6SL1, and the Abit KP6. These slotkets allowed Pentium Pro processors to be used with Slot 1 motherboards, however only a few number of chipsets supported these slotkets and so did not see widespread use. They eventually saw a renewed popularity in the form of Socket 370 to Slot 1 adapters, when Intel introduced Socket 370 Celeron and Pentium III processors in the late 1990s. These slotkets allowed for lower costs for computer builders (especially with dual-processor machines) and gave Slot 1 motherboards the ability to continue receiving CPU upgrades beyond the then-currently available Slot 1 CPUs. They also came equipped with their own voltage regulator modules, in order to supply the new CPU with a lower core voltage, which the motherboard would not otherwise allow.

In terms of compatibility with Pentium Pro processors on certain chipsets when used in a slotket, the Intel 440FX chipset explicitly supported both Pentium Pro and Pentium II processors, however the Intel 440BX and later Slot 1 chipsets only supported the Pentium II and not the Pentium Pro.

== Core specifications ==
=== Pentium Pro ===
- L1 cache: 8, 8 KB (data, instructions)
- L2 cache: 256, 512 KB (one die) or 1024 KB (two 512 KB dies) in a multi-chip module clocked at CPU-speed
- Socket: Socket 8
- Front-side bus: 60 and 66 MHz
- VCore: 3.1–3.3 V
- Fabrication: 0.50 μm or 0.35 BiCMOS
- Clockrate: 150, 166, 180, 200 MHz, (capable of 233 MHz on some motherboards)
- First release: November 1995

=== Pentium II Overdrive ===
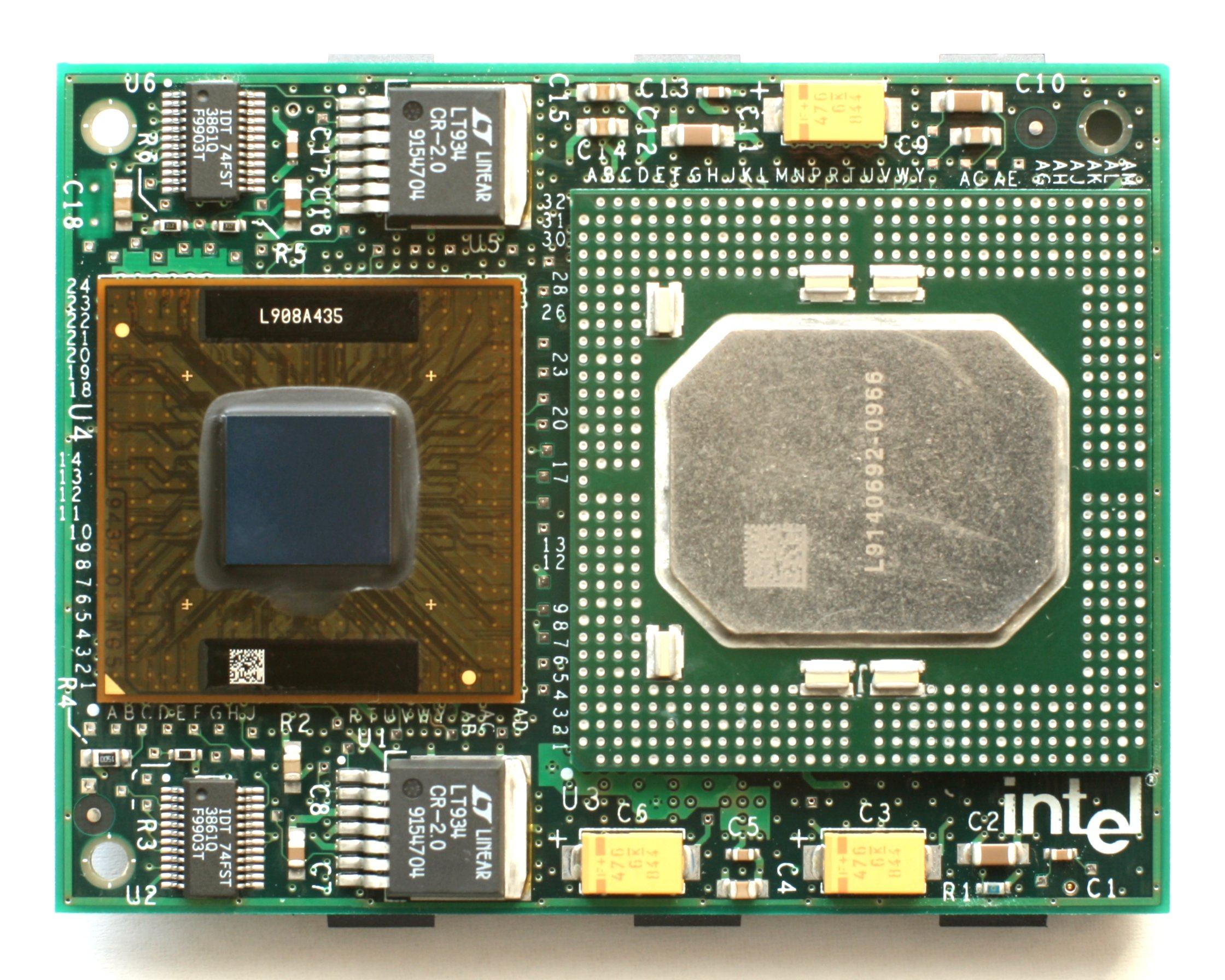
Pentium II Overdrive with heatsink removed. Flip-chip Deschutes core is on the left. 512 KB cache is on the right.

- L1 cache: 16, 16 KB (data + instructions)
- L2 cache: 512 KB external chip on CPU module clocked at CPU-speed
- Socket: Socket 8
- Multiplier: Locked at 5×
- Front-side bus: 60 and 66 MHz
- VCore: 3.1–3.3 V (has on-board voltage regulator)
- Fabrication: 0.25 μm
- Based on the Deschutes-generation Pentium II
- Clockrate: 300, 333 MHz
- First release: 1997
- Supports MMX technology

== Bus and multiprocessor capabilities ==
The design of the Pentium Pro bus was influenced by Futurebus (IEEE 896), the Intel iAPX 432 bus, and elements of the Intel i960 bus. Futurebus was intended to replace the 68000-based VMEbus used from the late 1970s as the main standardized advanced bus, however it remained stagnant within the standardization committee for many decades, and saw little real-world usage. The iAPX 432 was also a commercial failure, however they did learn how to build a split-transaction bus to support a cacheless multiprocessor system afterwards. The i960 had further developed the split-transaction iAPX 432 bus to include a cache coherency protocol, ending up with a feature set highly reminiscent of Futurebus' ambitions.

The Pentium Pro used GTL+ signaling in its front-side bus. The Pentium Pro could be used by itself on up to four-way designs. Eight-way Pentium Pro computers were also built, however these used multiple buses. The Pentium Pro was also designed to include the four-way SMP split-transaction cache-coherent bus as a mandatory feature of every chip produced, which also serves as a way to deny competition access to the socket using cloned processors.

While the Pentium Pro was not successful as a machine for the masses due to poor 16-bit support for Windows 95 and many other 16-bit and mixed 16/32-bit operating systems (as mentioned above), it did see significant successes in the file server space due to its advanced, integrated bus design, introducing many advanced features that had formerly only been available in the pricey workstation segment into the commodity marketplace.

== Pentium Pro/6th generation competitors ==
- AMD K5 and K6
- Cyrix 6x86 and MII
- IDT WinChip
- Intel P5 Pentium, co-existed with Pentium Pro for several years

== See also ==
- List of Intel Pentium II microprocessors
- List of Intel Pentium Pro microprocessors
