= Socket 8 =

CPU socket

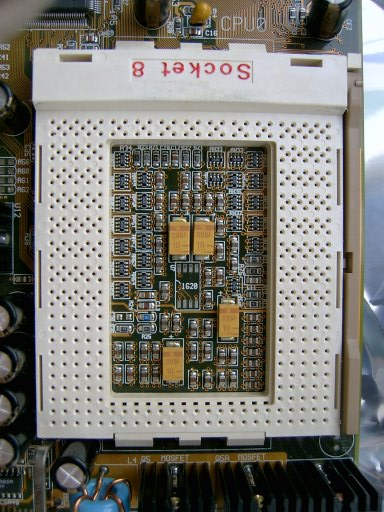
- Type: ZIF
- Chip form factors: CPGA
- Contacts: 387
- FSB protocol: AGTL
- FSB frequency: 60–66 MHz
- Voltage range: 3.1 or 3.3 V
- Processors: Pentium Pro, Pentium II OverDrive
- Predecessor: Socket 7
- Successor: Slot 2
- This article is part of the CPU socket series

The Socket 8 CPU socket was used exclusively with the Intel Pentium Pro and Pentium II Overdrive computer processors. Intel discontinued Socket 8 in favor of Slot 1 with the introduction of the Pentium II and Slot 2 with the release of the Pentium II Xeon in 1998.

== Technical specifications ==
Socket 8 is a unique rectangular CPGA socket with 387 pins. It supports FSB speeds ranging from 60 to 66 MHz, a voltage of 3.1 or 3.3 V, and support for the Pentium Pro and the Pentium II OverDrive CPUs. Socket 8 also has a unique pin arrangement pattern. One part of the socket has pins in a PGA grid, while the other part uses a SPGA grid.

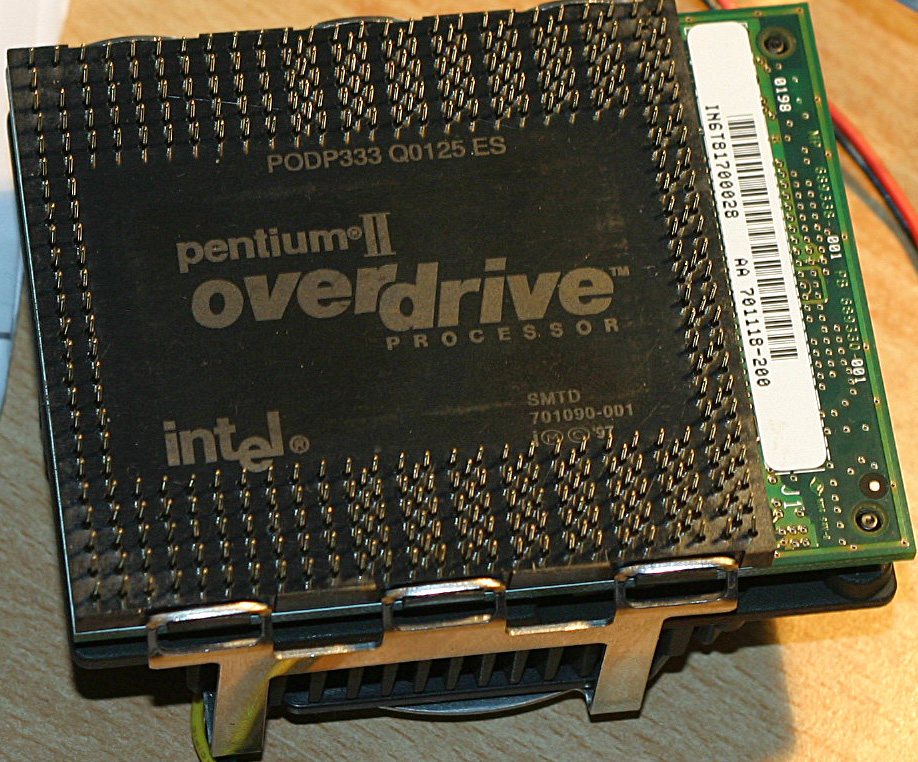
An engineering sample of the Pentium II Overdrive CPU showing the bottom of the unit.

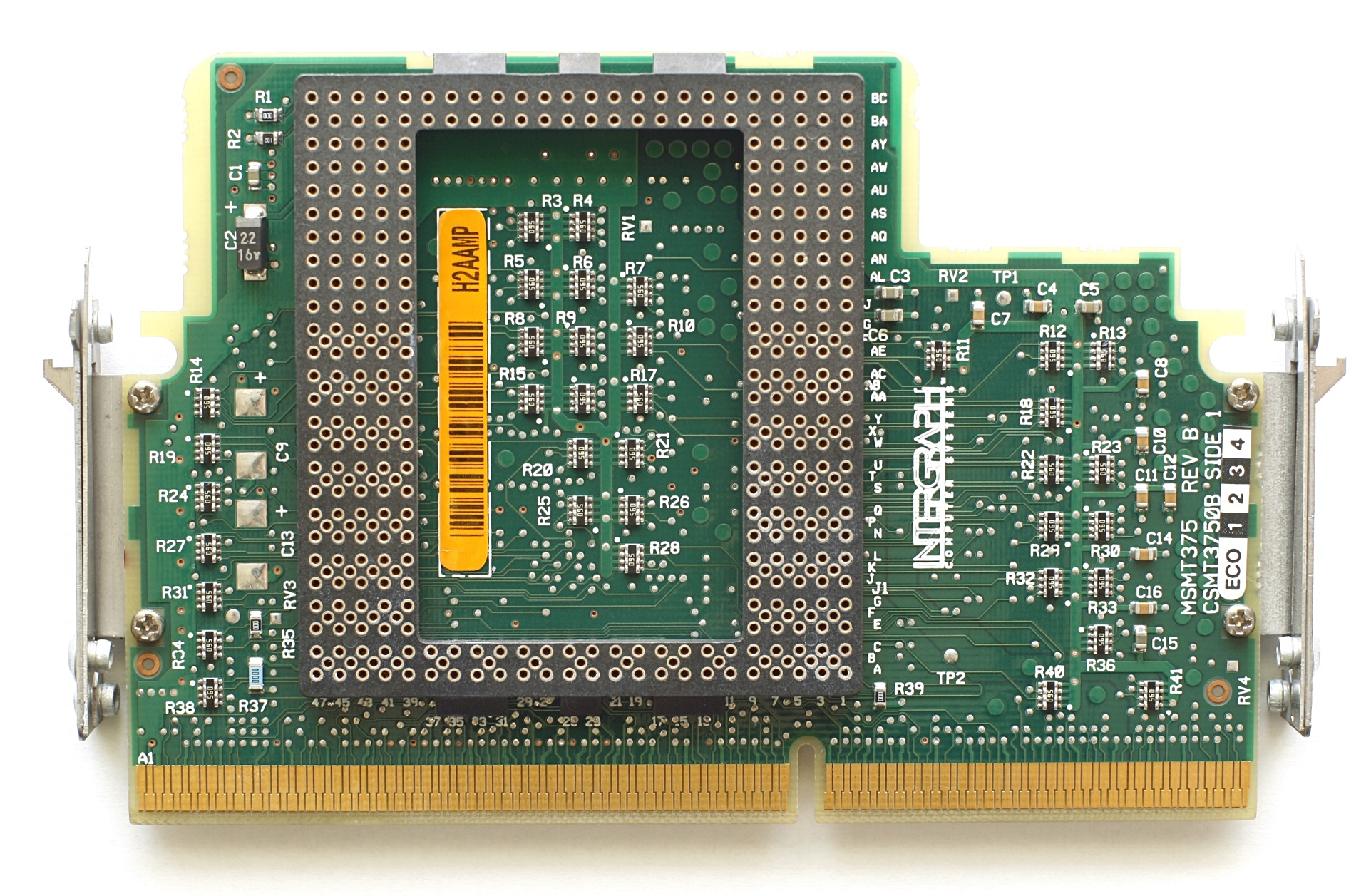
Socket 8 to Slot 1 adapter (Slotket)

== See also ==
- List of Intel microprocessors
