= Pedal Steel Guitar Association =

Pedal Steel Guitar Association is an organization dedicated to the pedal steel guitar. It was established in November 1973 in New York City, and has published The Pedal Steel Newsletter 10 times per year since December 1973.

The organization also holds an annual conference. It is held in Darien, CT in November.
