= HP Color Recovery =

Color Recovery is a technique used in Hewlett-Packard's 1990s workstation graphics devices to produce a 'near 24-bit' color look from an 8-bit framebuffer. Color recovery does rely on software support which is provided by libraries such as PHIGS, PEXLib, Starbase and Xlib (although Xlib does not enable it by default).

When using Color Recovery the data is sent to the driver as a 24-bit image. The driver will then dither the data (in most cases this can be done by the graphics hardware for maximum performance) which is stored in the framebuffer as an 8-bit image. On displaying that 8-bit image data, HP's color recovery technology produces in real time an approximation of the original 24-bit image based on the hints provided by the dithered data. The result is significantly better looking than dithering alone. According to the article in HP's journal, the technique could achieve up to 23 bits of color accuracy.

Color Recovery was supported on framebuffers such as:

- The integrated framebuffer in the HP 9000/712 workstation
- HCRX framebuffer
- Visualize EG
