= HP 9000 =

Line of workstation and server computer systems

- Also known as: HP Workstation
- Developer: Hewlett-Packard
- Type: Professional workstation Server
- Released: 1984; 42 years ago
- Lifespan: 1984-2009, 25 years
- Discontinued: 2003 (servers); 2009 (workstations)
- Operating system: HP-UX
- CPU: Motorola 68000, HP FOCUS, PA-RISC, Intel Itanium, Intel Xeon
- Marketing target: Business purpose
- Successor: Integrity (servers); Z (workstations)

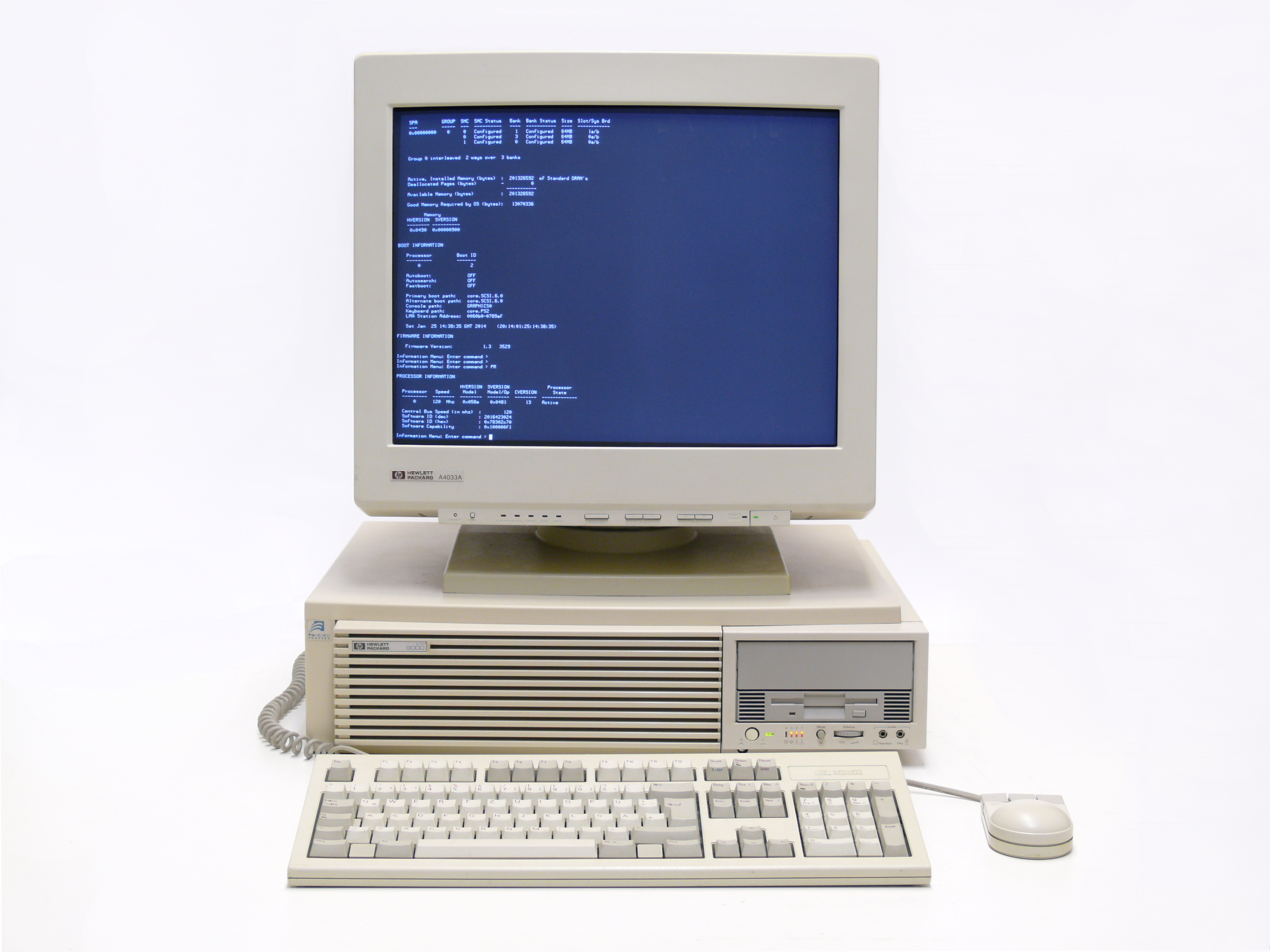
HP 9000 C110 workstation boot screen maintenance mode

HP 9000 is a line of workstation and server computer systems produced by the Hewlett-Packard (HP) Company. The native operating system for almost all HP 9000 systems is HP-UX, which is based on UNIX System V.

The HP 9000 brand was introduced in 1984 to encompass several extant technical workstation models launched formerly in the early 1980s. Most of these were based on the Motorola 68000 series, but there were also entries based on HP's own FOCUS designs. From the mid-1980s, the line was transitioned to HP's new PA-RISC architecture. Finally, in the 2000s, systems using the IA-64 were added.

The HP 9000 server line was discontinued in 2003, being superseded by Itanium-based Integrity Servers running HP-UX. The HP 9000 workstation line was discontinued in 2009, being superseded by HP Z. Support for HP-UX on HP 9000 systems ended in March 2021.

== History ==
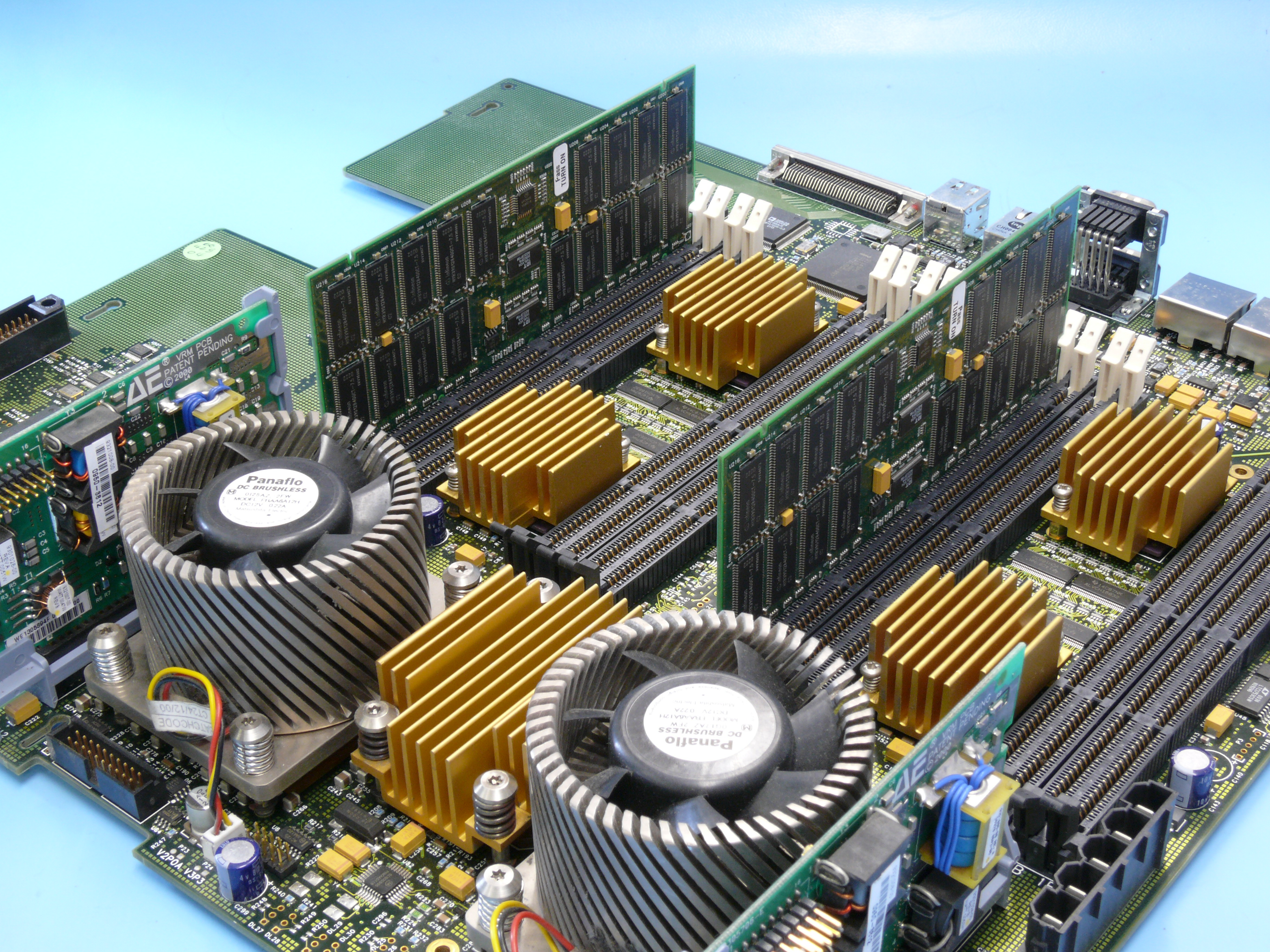
HP 9000 model J6000 system board

The first HP 9000 models comprised the HP 9000 Series 200 and Series 500 ranges. These were rebadged existing models, the Series 200 including various Motorola 68000 (68k) based workstations such as the HP 9826 and HP 9836, and the Series 500 using HP's FOCUS microprocessor architecture introduced in the HP 9020 workstation. These were followed by the HP 9000 Series 300 and Series 400 workstations, which also used Motorola 68000 series microprocessors. From the mid-1980s onward, HP began changing to its own microprocessors based on its proprietary PA-RISC instruction set architecture (ISA), for the Series 600, 700, 800, and later lines. More recent models use either the PA-RISC or its successor, the HP–Intel IA-64 ISA.

All of the HP 9000 line run various versions of the HP-UX operating system, except earlier Series 200 models, which ran standalone applications or the Basic Workstation / Pascal 3.1 Workstation operating systems. HP released the Series 400, also known as the Apollo 400, after acquiring Apollo Computer in 1989. These models had the ability to run either HP-UX or Apollo's Domain/OS.

From the early 1990s onward, HP replaced the HP 9000 Series numbers with an alphabetical Class nomenclature. In 2001, HP again changed the naming scheme for their HP 9000 servers. The A-class systems were renamed as the rp2400s, the L-class became the rp5400s, and the N-class the rp7400s. The rp prefix signified a PA-RISC architecture, while rx was used for IA-64-based systems, later rebranded HPE Integrity Servers.

In 2003, HP launched the xw series, which uses x86 processors and runs Windows. The xw series remained until 2009 when it was replaced by HP Z.

On 30 April 2008, HP announced end of sales for the PA-RISC-based HP 9000. The last order date for PA-RISC-based HP 9000 systems was 31 December 2008 and the last ship date was 1 April 2009. The last order date for new HP 9000 PA-RISC options was December 31, 2009, with a last ship date of 1 April 2010. HP intends to support these systems through to 2013, with possible extensions.

The end of life for HP 9000 also marks the end of an era, as it essentially marks HP's withdrawal from the Unix workstation market (the HP 9000 workstations are end of life, and there are no HP Integrity workstations, so there is no longer a solution which targets HP/UX at the desktop). When the move from PA-RISC (9000) to Itanium (Integrity) was announced, Integrity workstations running either HP/UX or Windows were initially announced and offered, but were moved to end of sales life relatively quickly, with no replacement (arguably because x86-64 made IA-64 uncompetitive on the desktop, and HP/UX does not support x86-64, with HP offering desktop Linux as an alternative, not fully compatible, solution).

== Workstation models ==
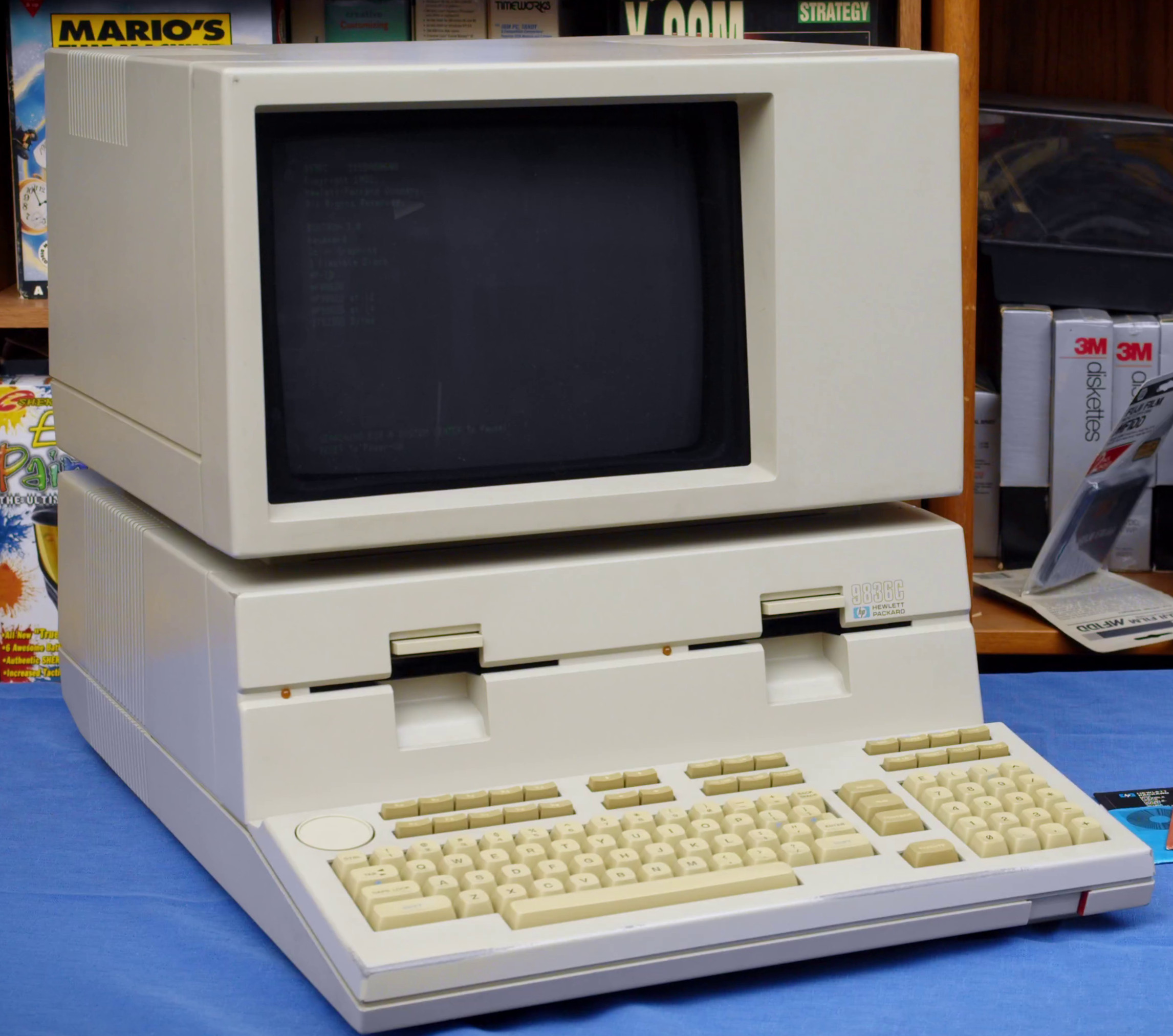
HP 9836C workstation

Prior to January 1985 (see also HP 9800 series):

- Series 200 – 16 (HP 9816), 20 (HP 9920), 26 (HP 9826), 36 (HP 9836)
- Series 500 – 20 (HP 9020), 30 (HP 9030), 40 (HP 9040)

After 1985:

- Series 200 – 216 (HP 9816), 217 (HP 9817), 220 (HP 9920), 226 (HP 9826), 236 (HP 9836), 237 (HP 9837)
- Series 300 – 310, 318, 319, 320, 322, 330, 332, 340, 345, 350, 360, 362, 370, 375, 380, 382, 385
- Series 400 (HP Apollo 9000 Series 400) – 400dl, 400s, 400t, 425dl, 425e, 425s, 425t, 433dl, 433s, 433t
- Series 500 – 520 (HP 9020), 530 (HP 9030), 540 (HP 9040), 550, 560
- Series 600 – 635SV, 645SV
- Series 700 – 705, 710, 712, 715, 720, 725, 730, 735, 742, 743, 744, 745, 747, 748, 750, 755
- B-class – B132L, B160L, B132L+, B180L, B1000, B2000, B2600
- C-class – C100, C110, C132L, C160, C160L, C180, C180L, C180XP, C200, C240, C360, C3000, C3600, C3650, C3700, C3750, C8000
- J-class – J200, J210, J210XC, J280, J282, J2240, J5000, J5600, J6000, J6700, J6750, J7000

=== Series 200 ===
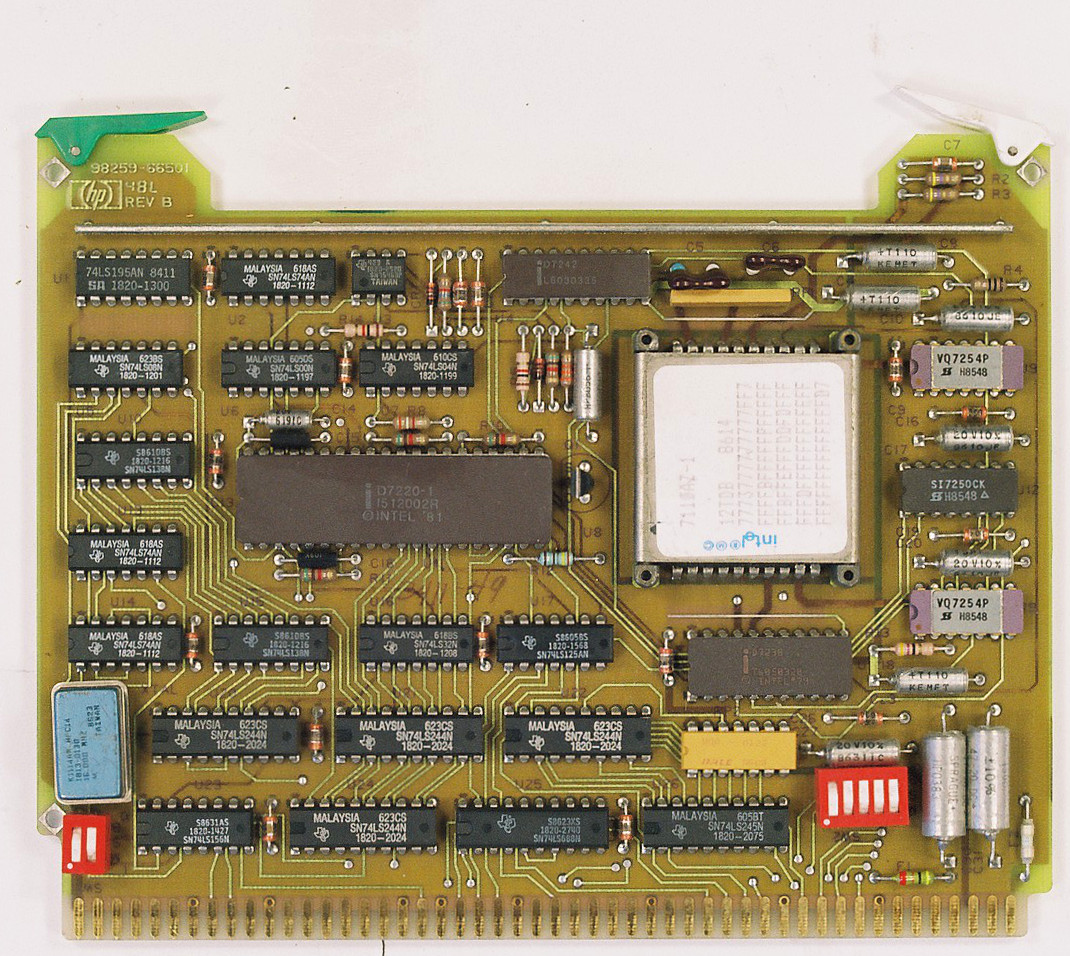
1 MBit Magnetic bubble memory board from early HP 9000/200 series computer

The Series 200 workstations originated before there were any "Series" at HP. The first model was the HP 9826A, followed by the HP 9836A. Later, a color version of the 9836 (9836C) was introduced for the CAD/CAM market. There was also a rack-mount version, the HP 9920A. These were all based on the Motorola 68000 chip. There were 'S' versions of the models that included memory bundled in. When HP-UX was included as an OS, there was a 'U' version of the 9836s and 9920 that used the 68012 processor. The model numbers included the letter 'U' (9836U, 9836CU, and 9920U). Later versions of the Series 200's included the 9816, 9817, and 9837. These systems were soon renamed as the HP Series 200 line, before being renamed again as part HP 9000 family, the HP 9000 Series 200.

There was also a "portable" version of the Series 200 called the Integral. The official model was the HP9807. This machine was about the size of a portable sewing machine, contained a MC68000 processor, ROM based HP-UX, 3½ inch floppy disk drive, inkjet printer, a keyboard, mouse, and an electroluminescent display similar to the early GRiD Compass computers. It was not battery powered, and unlike the other Series 200's that were manufactured in Fort Collins, Colorado, it was made in Corvallis, Oregon.

=== Series 300/400 ===
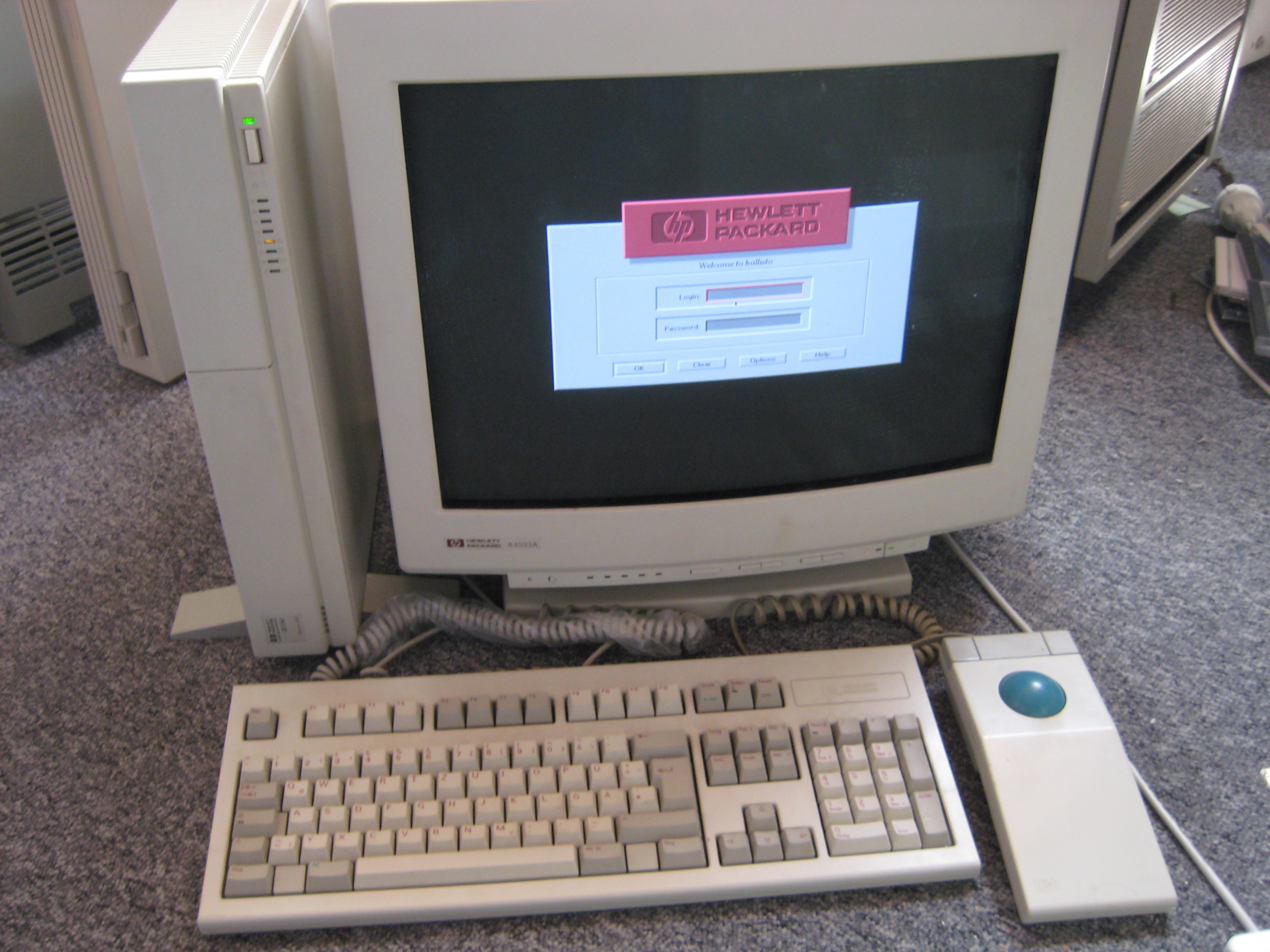
HP 9000 model 425 running HP-UX and Visual User Environment (VUE)

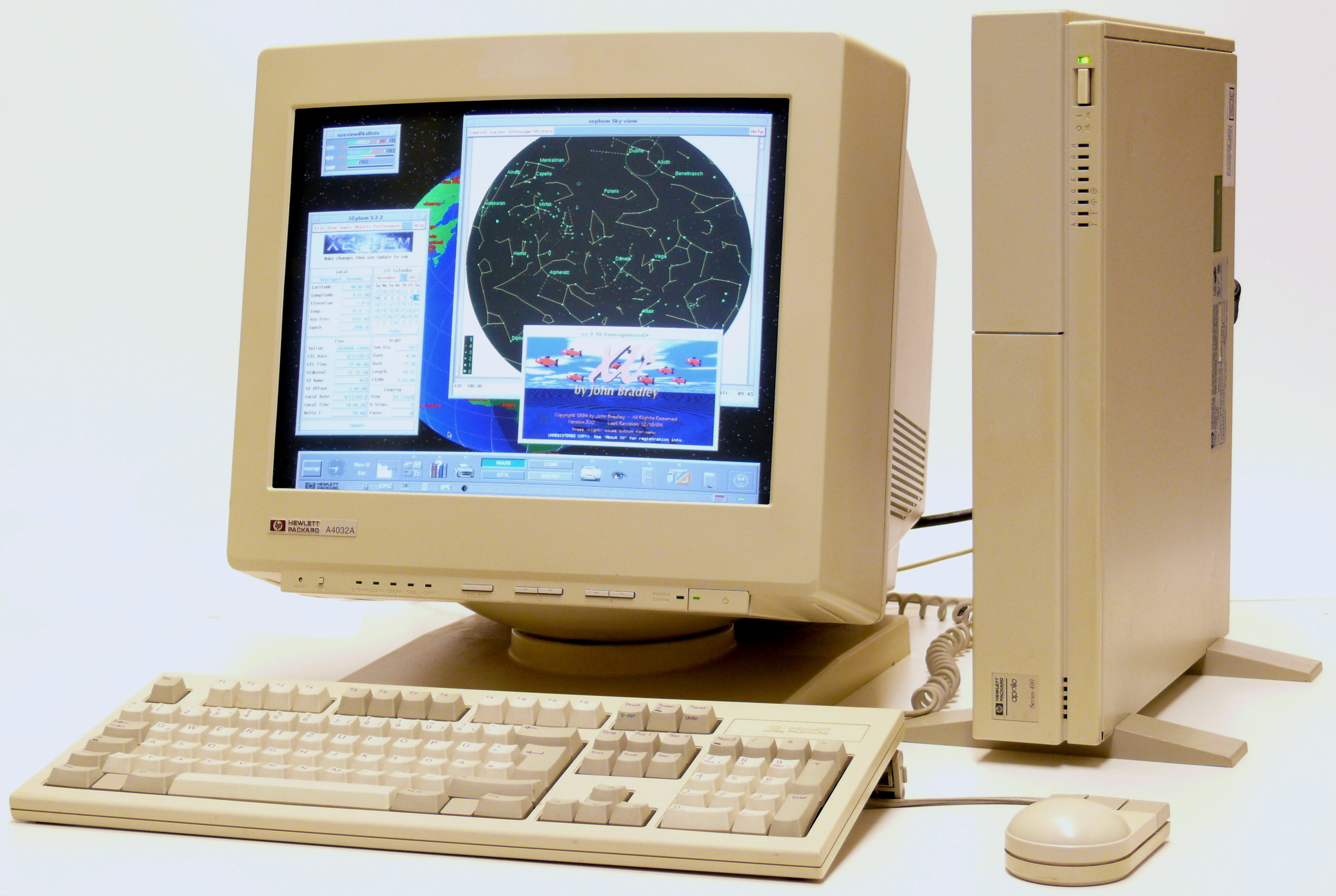
HP 9000 model 425 running HP-UX and VUE

The Series 300 workstations were based around Motorola 68000-series processors, ranging from the 68010 (Model 310, introduced 1985) to the Motorola 68040 (Model 38x, introduced 1991). The Series 400 (introduced 1990) were intended to supersede the Apollo/Domain workstations and were also based on the 68030/040. They were branded "HP Apollo" and added Apollo Domain/OS compatibility. The suffix 's' and 't' used on the Series 400 represented "Side" (as in Desk side) and "Top" (as in Desk top) model. The last two digits of the Series 400 originally was the clock frequency of the processor in MHz (e.g. 433 was 33 MHz). At introduction, the Series 400 had a socket for the MC68040, but since they were not available at the time, an emulator card with an MC68030 and additional circuitry was installed. Customers who purchased systems were given a guaranteed upgrade price of $5,000USD to the MC68040, when they became available. The Series 300 and 400 shared the same I/O interface as the Series 200. The 32-bit DIO-II bus is rated at 6 MB/s.

=== Series 500 ===
The Series 500s were based on the HP FOCUS microprocessor. They began as the HP 9020, HP 9030, and HP 9040. They were later renamed the HP Series 500 Model 20, 30, and 40 shortly after introduction, and later renamed again as the HP 9000 Model 520, 530 and 540. The 520 was a complete workstation with built-in keyboard, display, 5.25-inch floppy disk, and optional thermal printer and 10 MB hard disk. The 520 could run BASIC or HP-UX and there were three different models based on the displays attached (two color and one monochrome). The 530 was a rackmount version of the Series 500, could only run HP-UX, and used a serial interface console. The 540 was a 530 mounted inside a cabinet, similar to the disk drives offered then and included a serial multiplexer (MUX). Later models of the Series 500s were the 550 and 560, which had a completely different chassis and could be connected to graphics processors. The processors in the original Series 500s ran at 18 MHz, and could reach a benchmark speed of 1 million instructions per second (MIPS), equivalent to a VAX-11/780, then a common benchmark standard. They could be networked together and with 200 and 300 series using the Shared Resource Manager (SRM). Maximum memory was 10MB. A total of 3 Focus processors could be installed in a single machine.

Because of their performance, the US government placed the 500 series on its export restricted list. The computers were only permitted to be sold in Western Europe, Canada, Australia, and New Zealand, with any other country needing written approval.

=== Series 700 ===
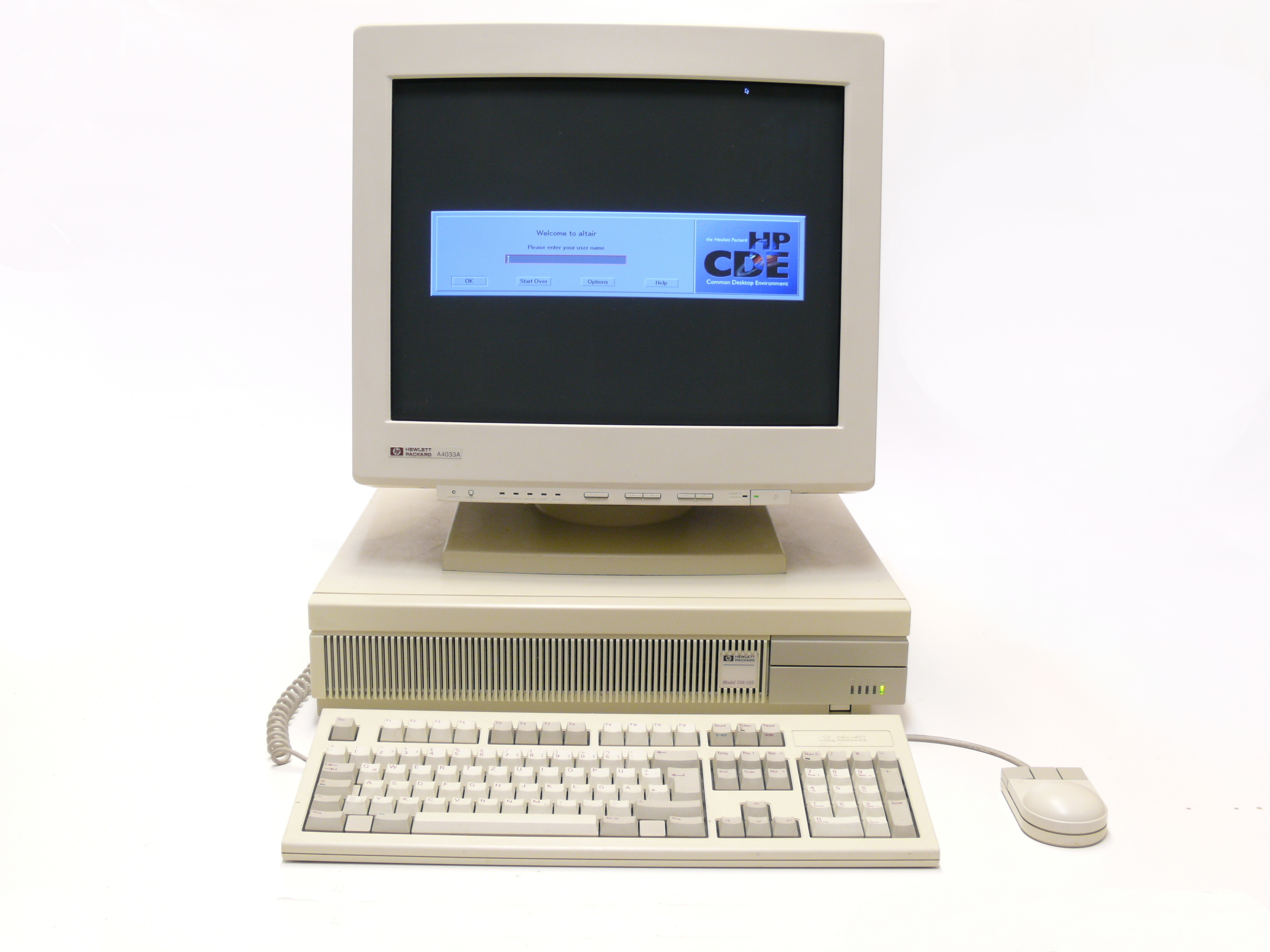
HP 9000 model 735 running the Common Desktop Environment (CDE) login manager

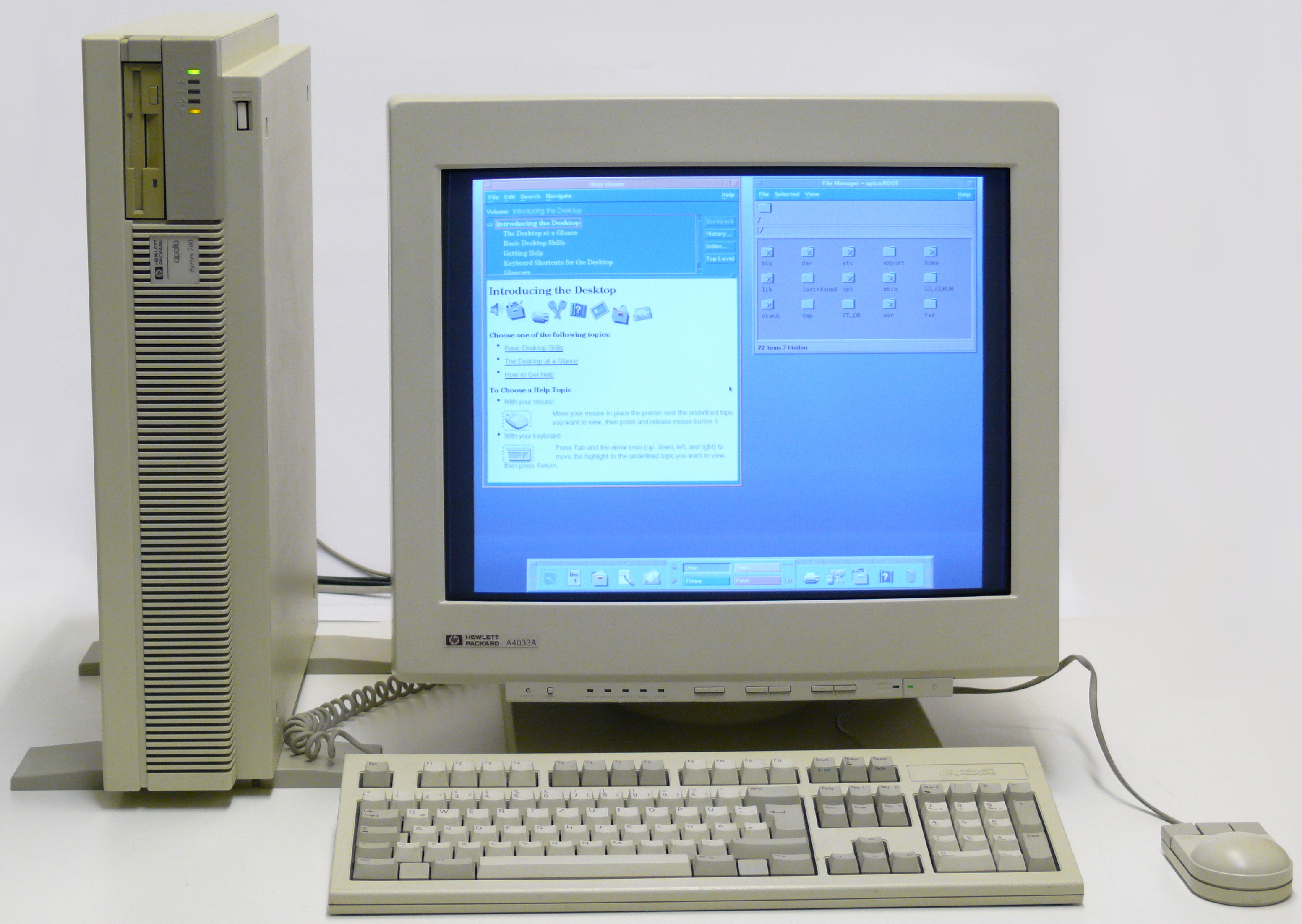
HP 9000 model 735 running HP-UX with CDE

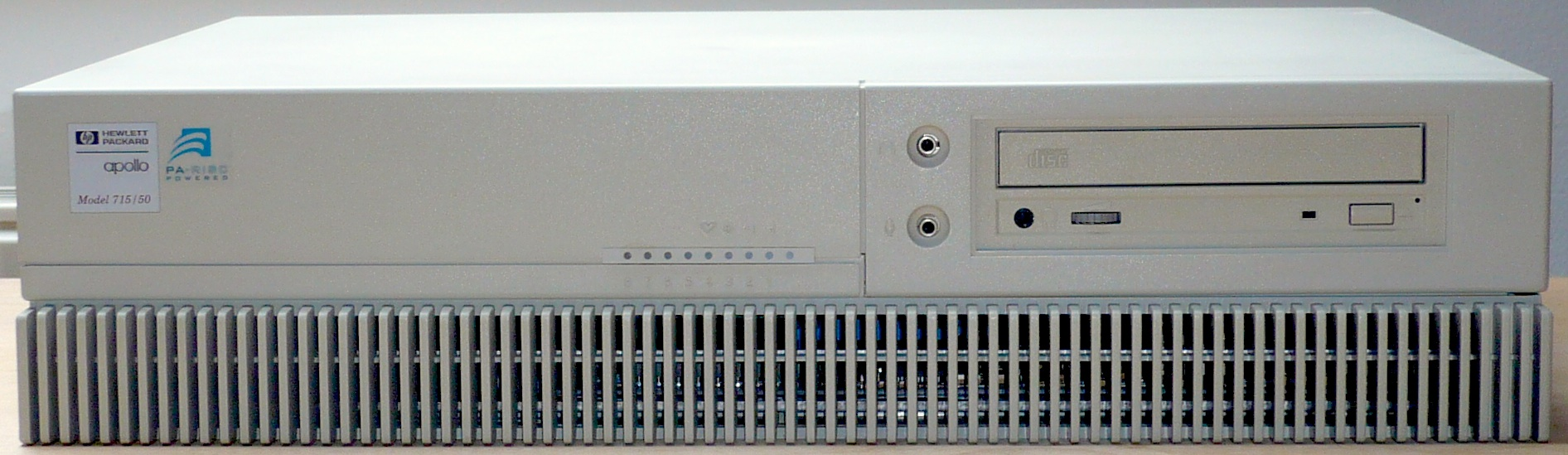
HP 9000 model 715

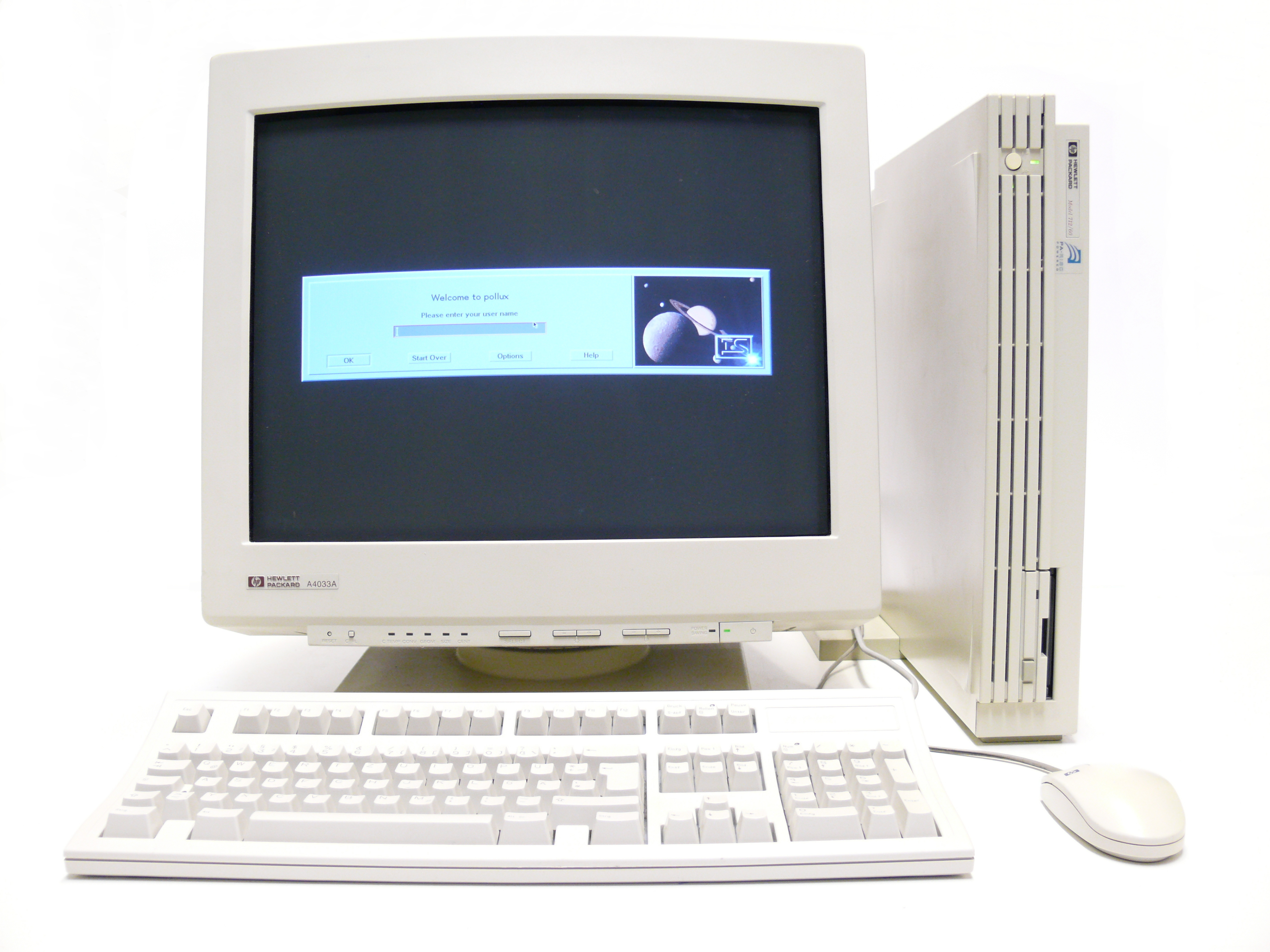
HP 9000 model 712 running HP-UX with CDE

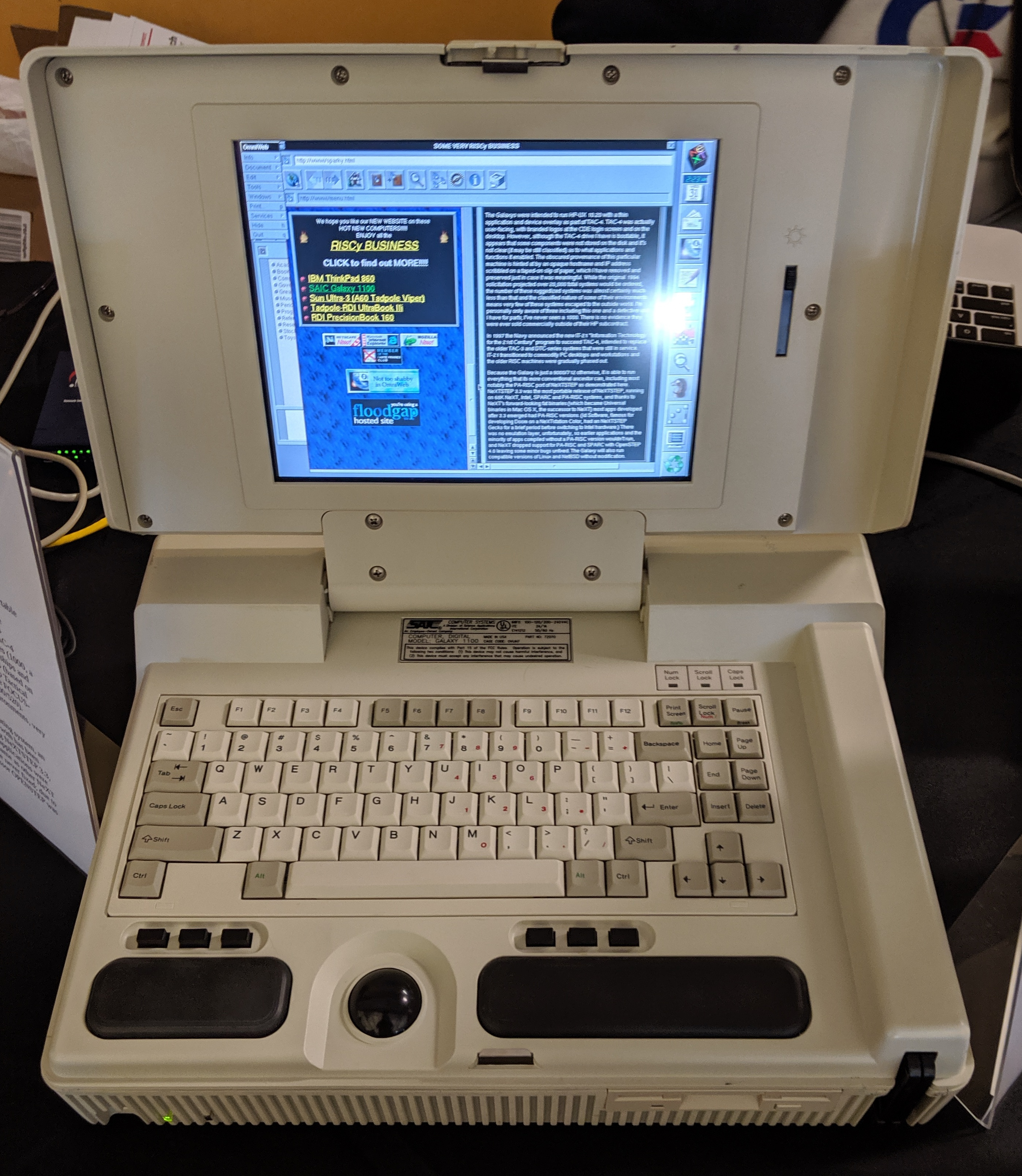
SAIC Galaxy 1100

The first workstations in the series, the Model 720, Model 730 and Model 750 systems were introduced on 26 March 1991 and were code-named "Snakes". The models used the PA-7000 microprocessor, with the Model 720 using a 50 MHz version and the Model 730 and Model 750 using a 66 MHz version. The PA-7000 is provided with 128 KB of instruction cache on the Model 720 and 730 and 256 KB on the Model 750. All models are provided with 256 KB of data cache. The Model 720 and Model 730 supported 16 to 64 MB of memory, while the Model 750 supported up to 192 MB. Onboard SCSI was provided by an NCR 53C700 SCSI controller. These systems could use both 2D and 3D graphics options, with 2D options being the greyscale GRX and the color CRX. 3D options were the Personal VRX and the Turbo GRX.

In early January 1992, HP introduced the Model 705, code-named "Bushmaster Snake", and the Model 710, code-named "Bushmaster Junior". Both systems are low-end diskless workstations, with the Model 705 using a 32 MHz PA-7000 and the Model 710 using a 50 MHz version. At introduction, the Model 705 was priced at under US$5,000, and the Model 710 under US$10,000.

The first Series 700 workstations were superseded by the Model 715/33, 715/50, 725/50 low-end workstations and the Model 735/99, 735/125, 755/99 and 755/125 high-end workstations on 10 November 1992. The existing Model 715 and Model 725 were later updated with the introduction of the Model 715/75 and 725/75 in September 1993. The new models used a 75 MHz PA-7100.

Increasing integration led to the introduction of the Model 712/60 and Model 712/80i workstations on 18 January 1994. Code-named "Gecko", these models were intended to compete with entry-level workstations from Sun Microsystems and high-end personal computers. They used the PA-7100LC microprocessor operating at 60 and 80 MHz, respectively. The Model 712/80i was an integer only model, with the floating point-unit disabled. Both supported 16 to 128 MB of memory.

The Model 715/64, 715/80, 715/100 and 725/100 were introduced in May 1994, targeted at the 2D and 3D graphics market. These workstations use the PA-7100LC microprocessor and supported 32 to 128 MB of memory, except for the Model 725/100, which supported up to 512 MB.

The Model 712/100 (King Gecko), an entry-level workstation, and Model 715/100 XC, a mid-range workstation, were introduced in June 1995. The Model 712/100 is a Model 712 with a 100 MHz PA-7100LC and 256 KB of cache while the Model 715/100 XC is a Model 715/100 with 1 MB of cache.

The Model 712 and 715 workstations feature the Lasi ASIC, connected by the GSC bus. The Lasi ASIC provided an integrated NCR 53C710 SCSI controller, an Intel Apricot 10 Mbit Ethernet interface, CD-quality sound, PS/2 keyboard and mouse, and a serial and a parallel port. All models, except for the 712 series machines also use the Wax ASIC to provide an EISA adapter, a second serial port and support for the HIL bus.

The SGC bus (System Graphics Connect), which is used in the earlier series 700 workstations, has similar specifications as PCI with 32-bit/33 MHz and a typical bandwidth of about 100 MB/s.

The SAIC Galaxy 1100 is a portable PA-RISC workstation based on the HP 9000/712 workstation in a ruggedized case, originally built by SAIC in the 1990s for military and intelligence applications. The workstation weighed 16 pounds and uses a 10.4" LCD screen, supporting a resolution up to 1024 × 768 pixel.

==== VME industrial workstations ====
Models 742i, 743i, 744, 745/745i, 747i, 748i.

=== B, C, J class ===
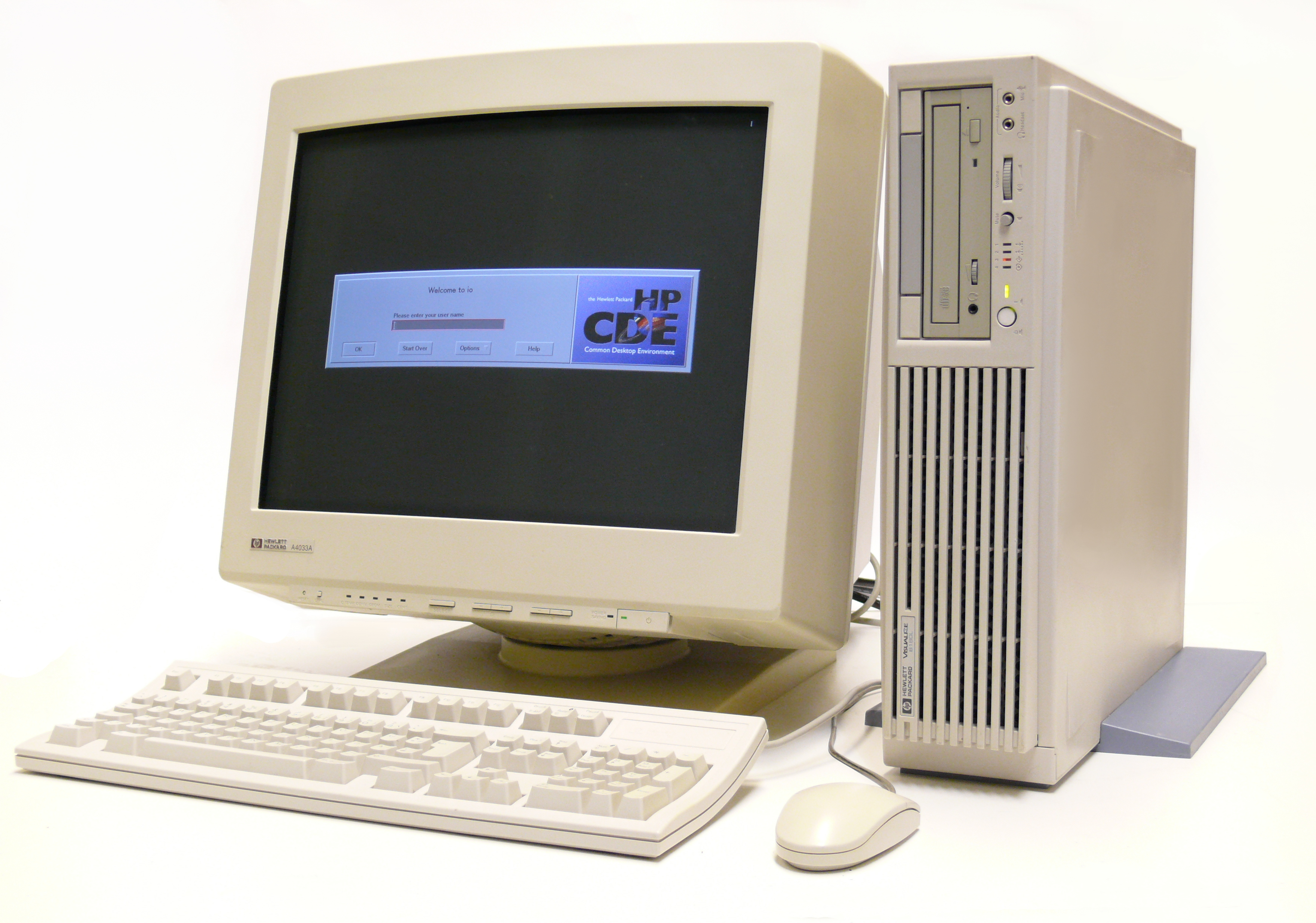
HP 9000 B180L displaying the CDE login manager

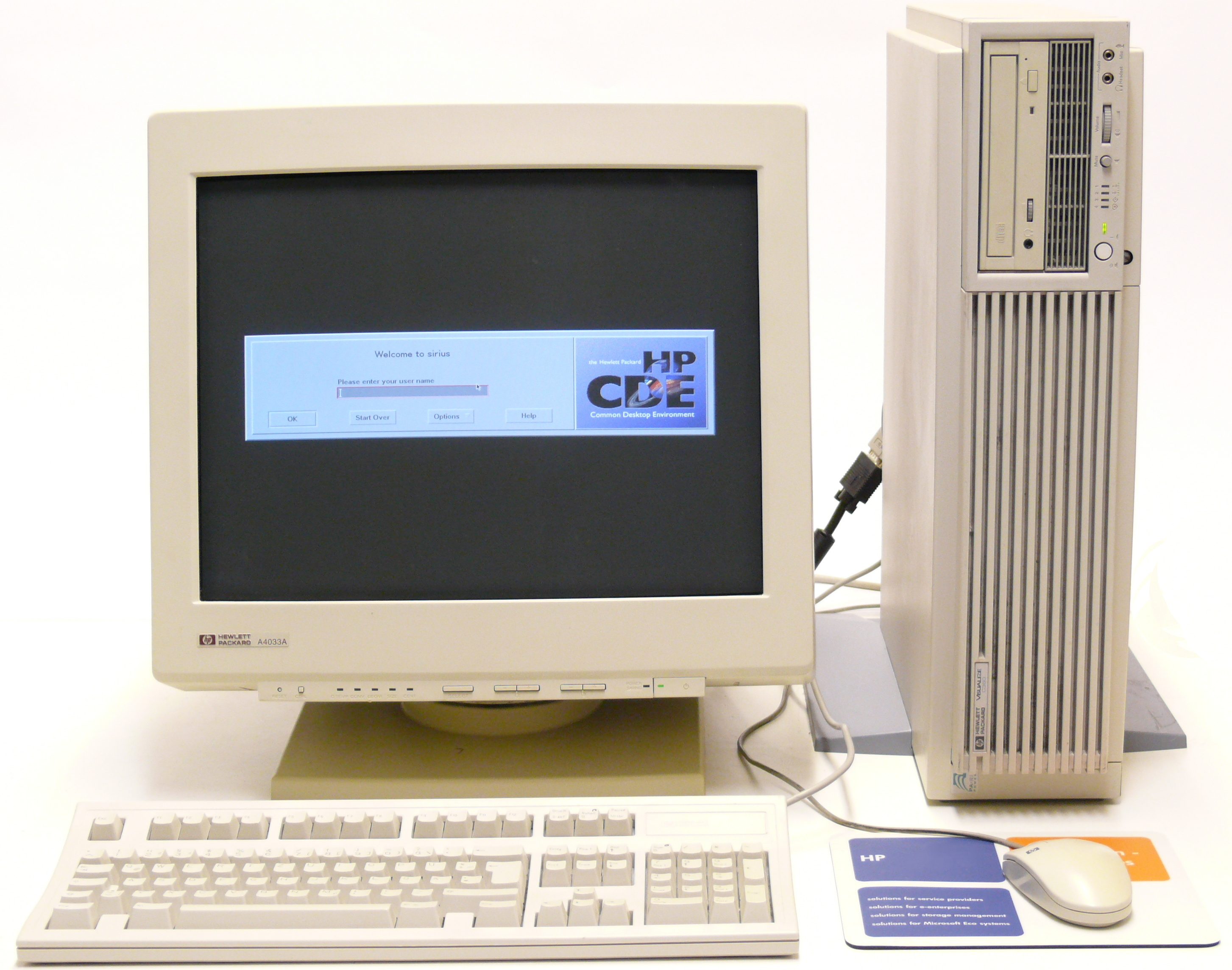
HP 9000 C360 displaying the CDE login manager

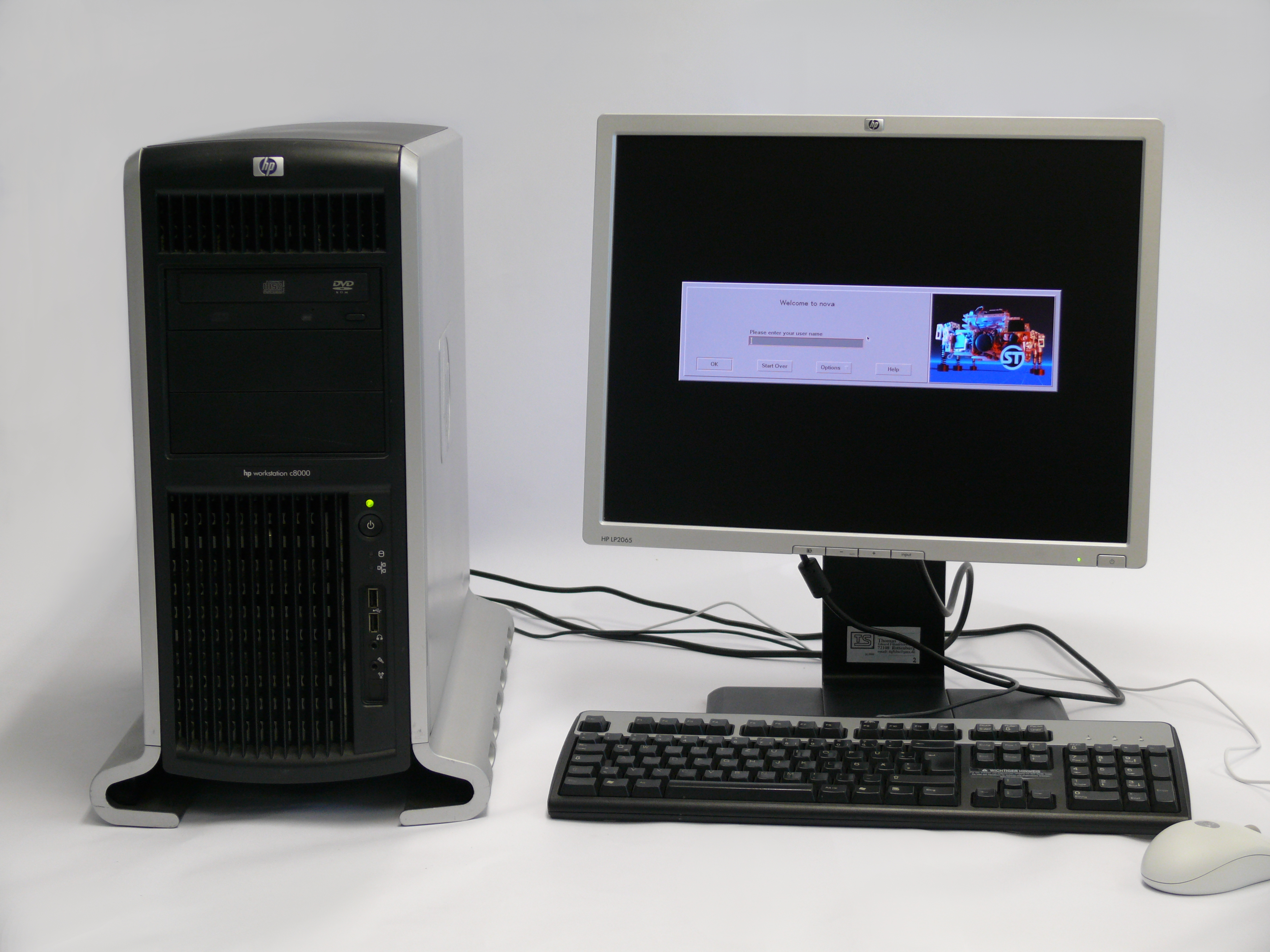
HP 9000 C8000 running HP-UX with CDE

The C100, C110, J200, J210 and J210XC use the PA-7200 processor, connected to the UTurn IOMMU via the Runway bus. The C100 and C110 are single processor systems, and the J200 and J210 are dual processor systems. The Uturn IOMMU has two GSC buses. These machines continue to use the Lasi and Wax ASICs.

The B132L (introduced 1996), B160L, B132L+, B180L, C132L, C160L and C180L workstations are based on the PA-7300LC processor, a development of the PA-7100LC with integrated cache and GSC bus controller. Standard graphics is the Visualize EG. These machines use the Dino GSC to PCI adapter which also provides the second serial port in place of Wax; they optionally have the Wax EISA adapter.

The C160, C180, C180-XP, J280 and J282 use the PA-8000 processor and are the first 64-bit HP workstations. They are based on the same Runway/GSC architecture as the earlier C and J class workstations.

The C200, C240 and J2240 offer increased speed with the PA-8200 processor and the C360 uses the PA-8500 processor.

The B1000, B2000, C3000, J5000 and J7000 were also based on the PA-8500 processor, but had a very different architecture. The U2/Uturn IOMMU and the GSC bus is gone, replaced with the Astro IOMMU, connected via Ropes to several Elroy PCI host adapters.

The B2600, C3600 and J5600 upgrade these machines with the PA-8600 processor. The J6000 is a rack-mountable workstation which can also be stood on its side in a tower configuration.

The C3650, C3700, C3750, J6700 and J6750 are PA-8700-based.

The C8000 uses the dual-core PA-8800 or PA-8900 processors, which uses the same bus as the McKinley and Madison Itanium processors and shares the same zx1 chipset. The Elroy PCI adapters have been replaced with Mercury PCI-X adapters and one Quicksilver AGP 8x adapter.

== Server models ==
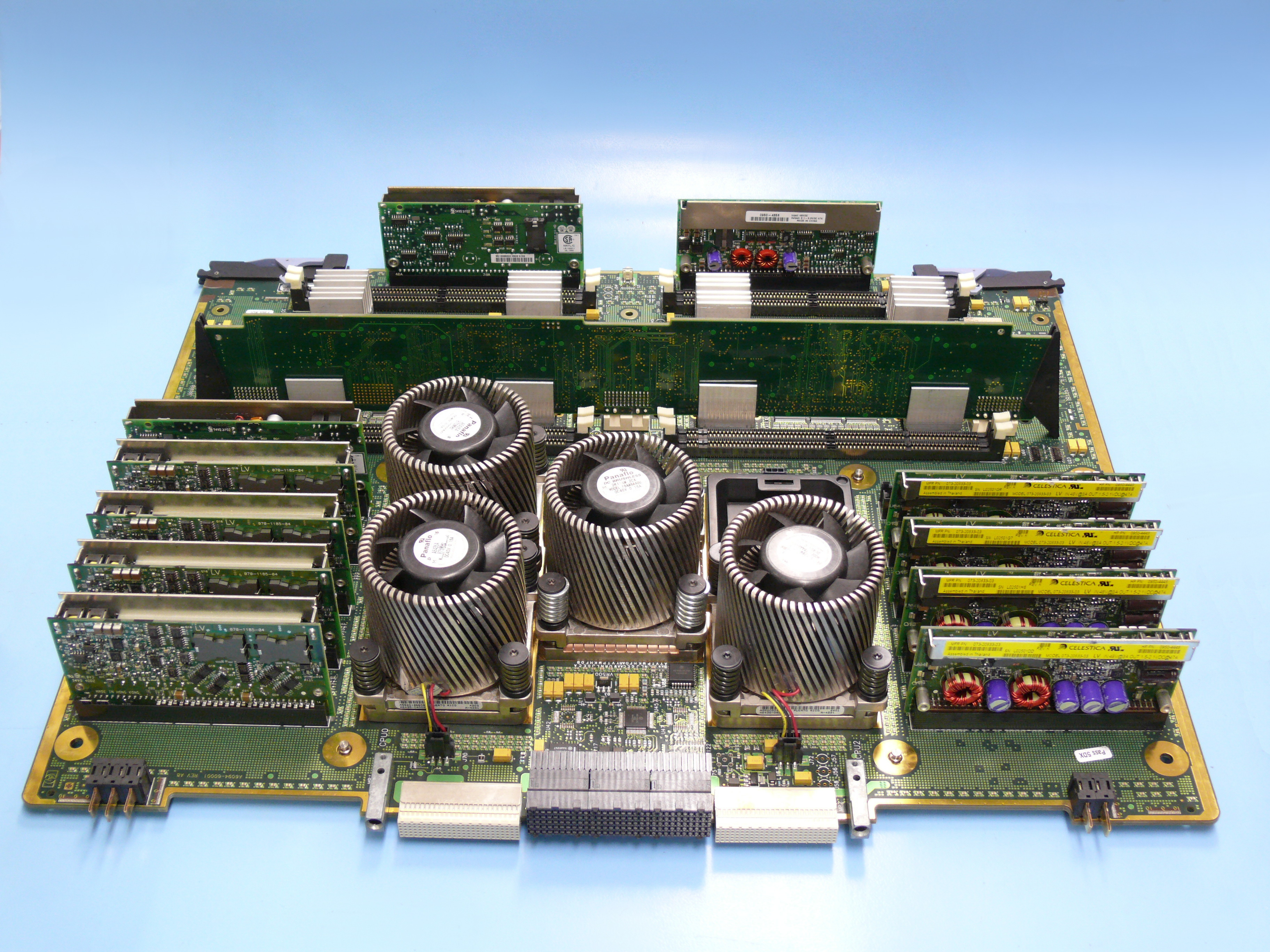
HP 9000 RP7410 system board with quad PA-RISC 8700+ CPUs

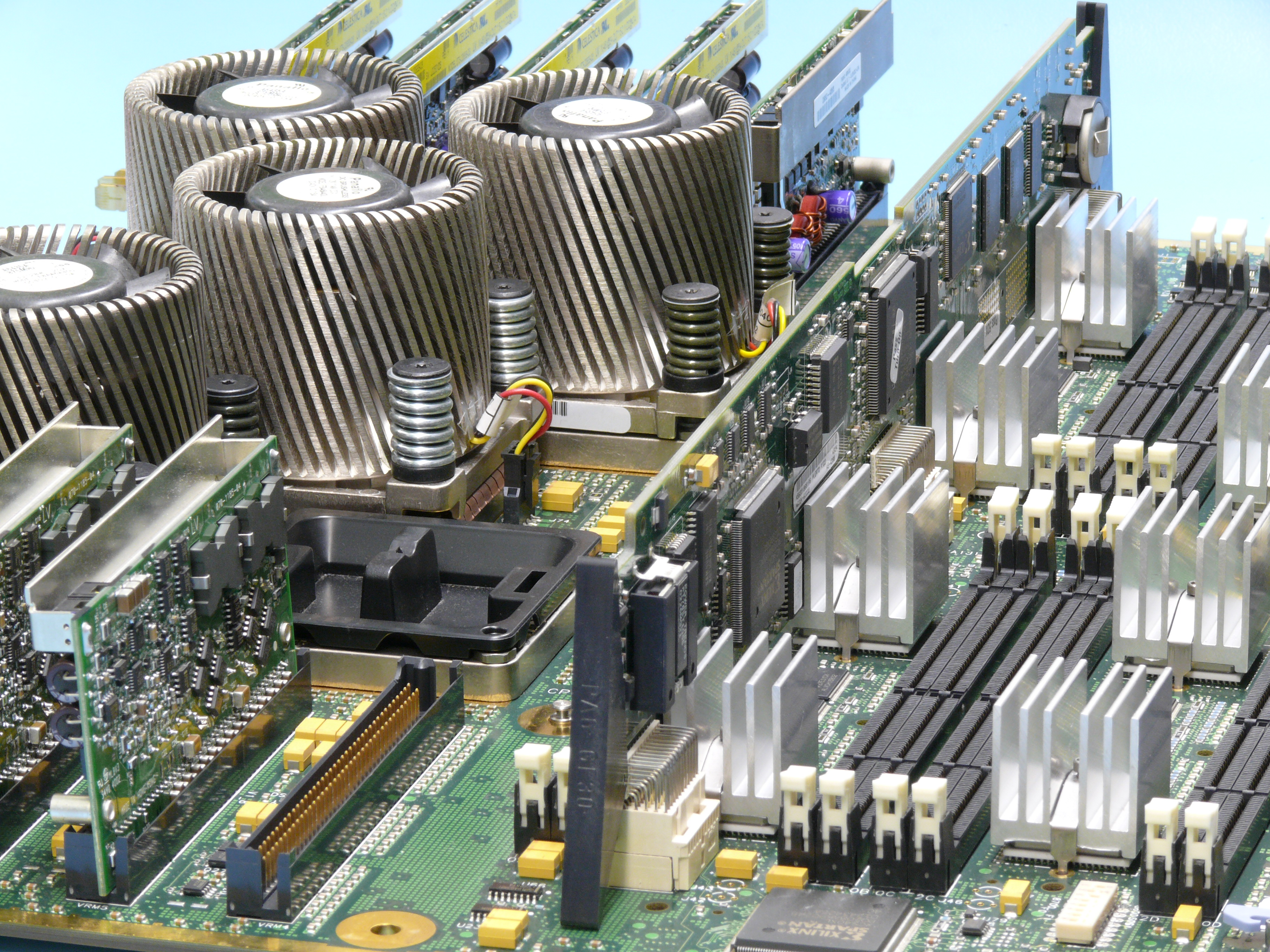
HP 9000 RP7410 system board with quad PA-RISC 8700+ CPUs

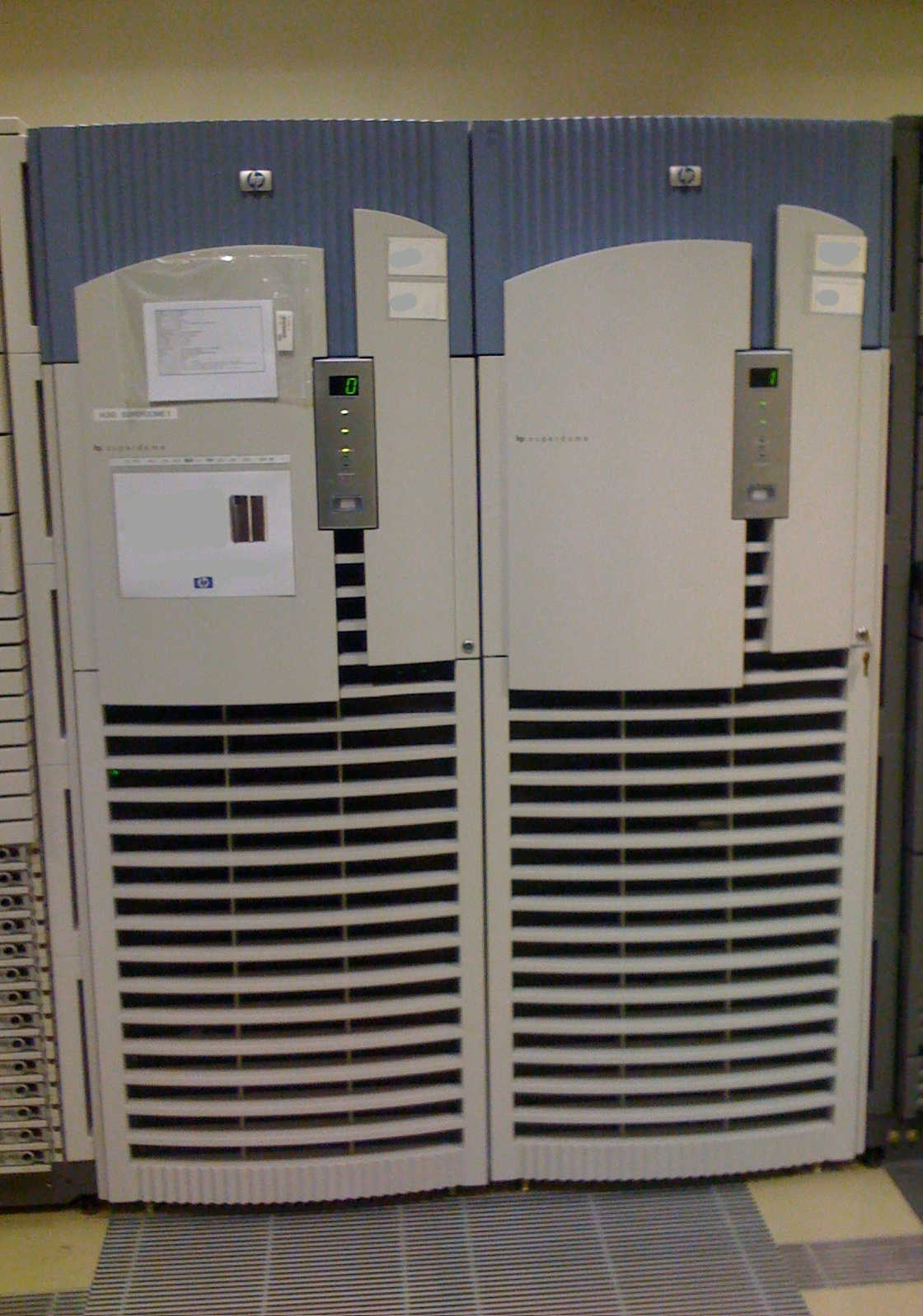
HP 9000 Superdome PA-RISC model

- 800 Series – 807, 817, 822, 825, 827, 832, 835, 837, 840, 842, 845, 847, 850, 855, 857, 867, 877, 887, 897
- 1200 FT Series – 1210, 1245, 1245 PLUS
- A-class – A180, A180C (Staccato), A400, A500
- D-class – D200, D210, D220, D230, D250, D260, D270, D280, D300, D310, D320, D330, D350, D360, D370, D380, D390
- E-class – E25, E35, E45, E55
- F-class – F10, F20, F30 (Nova)
- G-class – G30, G40, G50, G60, G70 (Nova / Nova64)
- H-class – H20, H30, H40, H50, H60, H70
- I-class – I30, I40, I50, I60, I70
- K-class – K100, K200, K210, K220, K250, K260, K360, K370, K380, K400, K410, K420, K450, K460, K570, K580
- L-class – L1000, L1500, L2000, L3000
- N-class – N4000
- N-class – N4004
- N-class – N4005
- N-class – N4006
- R-class – R380, R390
- S-class – rebadged Convex Exemplar SPP2000 (single-node)
- T-class – T500, T520, T600
- V-class – V2200, V2250, V2500, V2600
- X-class – rebadged Convex Exemplar SPP2000 (multi-node)
- rp2400 – rp2400 (A400), rp2405 (A400), rp2430 (A400), rp2450 (A500), rp2470 (A500) (former A-class)
- rp3400 – rp3410-2, rp3440-4 (1-2 PA-8800/8900 processors)
- rp4400 – rp4410-4, rp4440-8
- rp5400 – rp5400, rp5405, rp5430, rp5450, rp5470 (former L-class)
- rp7400 – rp7400 (former N-class)
- rp7405 – rp7405, rp7410, rp7420-16, rp7440-16
- rp8400 – rp8400, rp8410, rp8420-32, rp8440-32
- HP 9000 Superdome – SD-32, SD-64, SD-128 (PA-8900 processors)

=== D-class (Codename: Ultralight) ===
The D-class are entry-level and mid-range servers that succeeded the entry-level E-class servers and the mid-range G-, H-, I-class servers. The first models were introduced in late January 1996, consisting of the Model D200, D210, D250, D310 and D350. The Model D200 is a uniprocessor with a 75 MHz PA-7100LC microprocessor, support for up to 512 MB of memory and five EISA/HP-HSC slots. The Model D210 is similar, but it used a 100 MHz PA-7100LC. The Model D250 is dual-processor model and it used the 100 MHz PA-7100LC. It supported up to 768 MB of memory and had five EISA/HP-HSC slots. The Model D310 is a uniprocessor with a 100 MHz PA-7100LC, up to 512 MB of memory and eight EISA/HP-HSC slots. The Model D350 is a high-end D-class system, a dual-processor, it had two 100 MHz PA-7100LCs, up to 768 MB of memory and eight EISA/HP-HSC slots.

In mid-September 1996, two new D-class servers were introduced to utilize the new 64-bit PA-8000 microprocessor, the Model D270 uniprocessor and the Model D370 dual-processor. Both were positioned as entry-level servers. They used the 160 MHz PA-8000 and supported 128 MB to 1.5 GB of memory.

In January 1997, the low-end Model D220, D230, D320 and D330 were introduced, using 132 and 160 MHz versions of the PA-7300LC microprocessor.

The D-class are tower servers with up to two microprocessors and are architecturally similar to the K-class. They sometimes masquerade as larger machines as HP shipped them mounted vertically inside a large cabinet containing a power supply and multiple disks with plenty of room for air to circulate.

=== R-class ===
The R-class is simply a D-class machine packaged in a rack-mount chassis. Unlike the D-class systems, it does not support hot-pluggable disks.

=== N-class ===
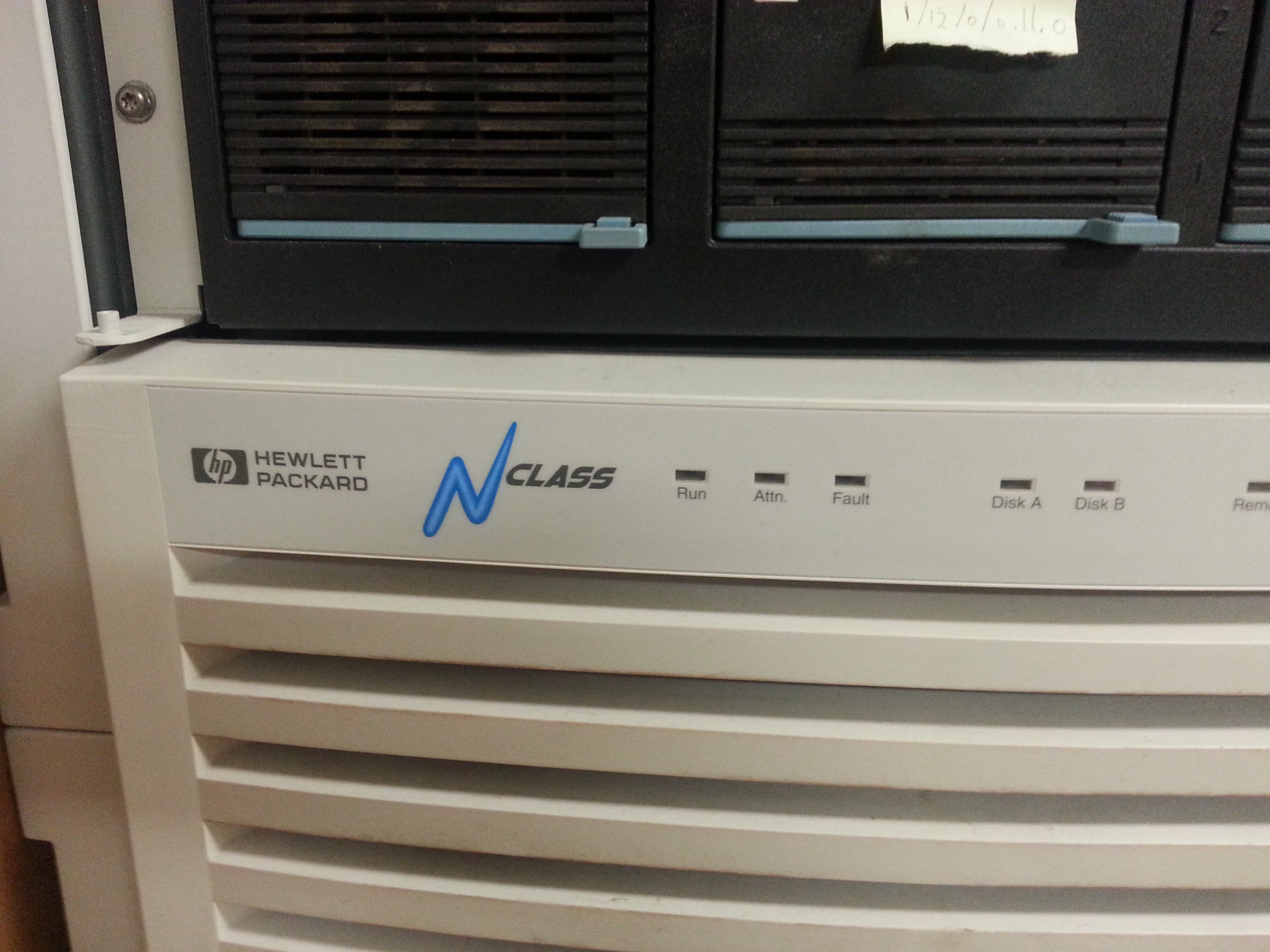
N-class HP 9000

The N-class is a 10U rackmount server with up to eight CPUs and 12 PCI slots. It uses two Merced buses, one for every four processor slots. It is not a NUMA machine, having equal access to all memory slots. The I/O is unequal though; having one Ike IOMMU per bus means that one set of CPUs are closer to one set of I/O slots than the other.

The N-class servers were marketed as "Itanium-ready", although when the Itanium shipped, no Itanium upgrade was made available for the N class. The N class did benefit from using the Merced bus, bridging the PA-8x00 microprocessors to it via a special adapter called DEW.

The N4000 was upgraded with newer processors throughout its life, with models called N4000-36, N4000-44 and N4000-55 indicating microprocessor clock frequencies of 360, 440, and 550 MHz, respectively. It was renamed to the rp7400 series in 2001.

=== L-class ===
The L-class servers are 7U rackmount machines with up to 4 CPUs (depending on model). They have 12 PCI slots, but only 7 slots are enabled in the entry-level L1000 system. Two of the PCI slots are occupied by factory-integrated cards and cannot be utilized for I/O expansion by the end-user.

The L1000 and L2000 are similar to the A400 and A500, being based on an Astro/Elroy combination. They initially shipped with 360 MHz and 440 MHz PA-8500 and were upgraded with 540 MHz PA-8600.

The L3000 is similar to the N4000, being based on a DEW/Ike/Elroy combination. It shipped only with 550 MHz PA-8600 CPUs.

The L-class family was renamed to the rp5400 series in 2001.

=== A-class ===
The A180 and A180C were 32-bit, single-processor, 2U servers based on the PA-7300LC processor with the Lasi and Dino ASICs.

The A400 and A500 servers were 64-bit, single and dual-processor 2U servers based on the PA-8500 and later processors, using the Astro IOMMU and Elroy PCI adapters. The A400-36 and A500-36 machines used the PA-8500 processor running at 360 MHz; the A400-44 and A500-44 are clocked at 440 MHz. The A500-55 uses a PA-8600 processor running at 550 MHz and the A500-75 uses a PA-8700 processor running at 750 MHz.

The A-class was renamed to the rp2400 series in 2001.

=== S/X-class ===
The S- and X-class were Convex Exemplar SPP2000 supercomputers rebadged after HP's acquisition of Convex Computer in 1995. The S-class was a single-node SPP2000 with up to 16 processors, while the X-class name was used for multi-node configurations with up to 512 processors. These machines ran Convex's SPP-UX operating system.

=== V-class ===
The V-class servers were based on the multiprocessor technology from the S-class and X-class. The V2200 and V2250 support a maximum of 16 processors, and the V2500 and V2600 support a maximum of 32 processors. The V-class systems are physically large systems that need extensive cooling and three-phase electric power to operate. They provided a transitional platform between the T-class and the introduction of the Superdome.

== Operating systems ==
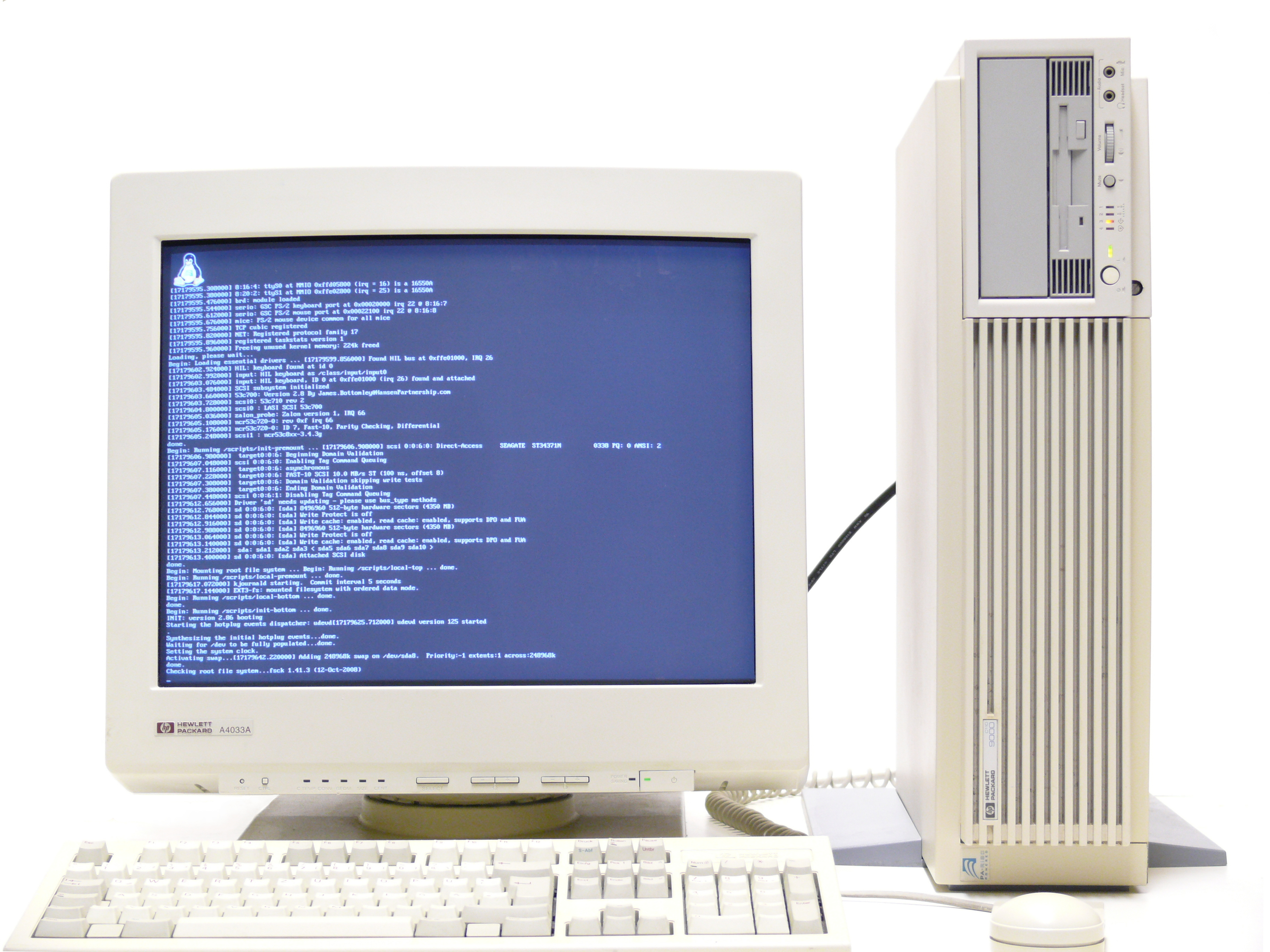
HP 9000 C110 running Linux

Apart from HP-UX and Domain/OS (on the 400), many HP 9000s can also run the Linux operating system. Some PA-RISC-based models are able to run NeXTSTEP.

Berkeley Software Distribution (BSD) Unix was ported to the HP 9000 as HPBSD; the resulting support code was later added to 4.4BSD. Its modern variants NetBSD and OpenBSD also support various HP 9000 models, both Motorola 68k and PA-RISC based.

In the early 1990s, several Unix R&D systems were ported to the PA-RISC platform, including several attempts of OSF/1, various Mach ports and systems that combined parts of Mach with other systems (MkLinux, Mach 4/Lites). The origin of these ports were mostly either internal HP Labs projects or HP products, or academic research, mostly at the University of Utah.

One project conducted at HP Laboratories involved replacing core HP-UX functionality, specifically the virtual memory and process management subsystems, with Mach functionality from Mach 2.0 and 2.5. This effectively provided a vehicle to port Mach to the PA-RISC architecture, as opposed to starting with the Berkeley Software Distribution configured to use the Mach kernel infrastructure and porting this to PA-RISC, and thereby delivered a version of HP-UX 2.0 based on Mach, albeit with certain features missing from both Mach and HP-UX. The motivation for the project was to investigate performance issues with Mach related to the cache architecture of PA-RISC along with potential remedies for these issues.

== See also ==
- HP 3000
- HPE Integrity Servers
- HP Superdome
- HP 9800 series, prior series of scientific computer workstations
- HP 7935 disc drive
