= Visualize EG =

The Visualize EG is a Hewlett-Packard 2D graphics card used in their Series 700 UNIX workstations.

The Visualize-EG (project name Graffiti) was the basic graphics card in the era of HP's older B, C and J class workstations (e.g., the B132). In those, EG was the integrated (on the motherboard) display device, although it was also available in GSC and later PCI card form. EG is a descendant of HP's CRX family of graphics devices.

Despite being entry level, and offering no hardware 3D features, EG had excellent 2D performance. Specifications (without optional memory upgrade) are:

- Resolutions up to 1280 × 1024 at 75 Hz.
- 8 planes providing up to 256 simultaneously displayed colours chosen from a true-color palette.
- Two 256-entry hardware colour maps.
- HP Color recovery technology for simulated True Color using only 8 planes.

Optional memory can be used to provide one or the other of these benefits:

1. Extra resolution – up to 1600 × 1200 or 1200 × 1600 @ 75 Hz.
2. 16 more planes, giving 24 in total:

16 of these become image planes with the other 8 used as moveable "overlay" planes. Another 2 hardware colormaps become available, providing 2 for the image planes and 2 for the overlay planes.

The EG features an accelerated 2D graphics engine that is capable of:

- BitBLT featuring boolean and arithmetic raster operations at up to 241 million pixels per second.
- Filling – a very fast (up to 2.3 billion pixels per second) hardware fill allows filling of rectangular areas with solid color or stippled pattern. It is also possible to fill with bitmap patterns.
- Vectors – the hardware can produce over 7 million 10-pixel X Window System compliant vectors per second.
- Trapezoids – hardware support for trapezoids means filled polygons can be created at a rate of 106 million pixels per second.
- Window clip and offset – time-consuming clipping and relative co-ordinate translation are provided for in hardware.
- Hardware cursor – a 2-color 64 × 64 pixel 'sprite' is provided for presenting the cursor.

The programming interface of the EG (and other HP graphics devices) has been kept private to HP, although efforts to release them are underway. The documentation needs to be "scrubbed" to check and remove company confidential material.
