= HP Focus =

Hewlett-Packard microprocessor

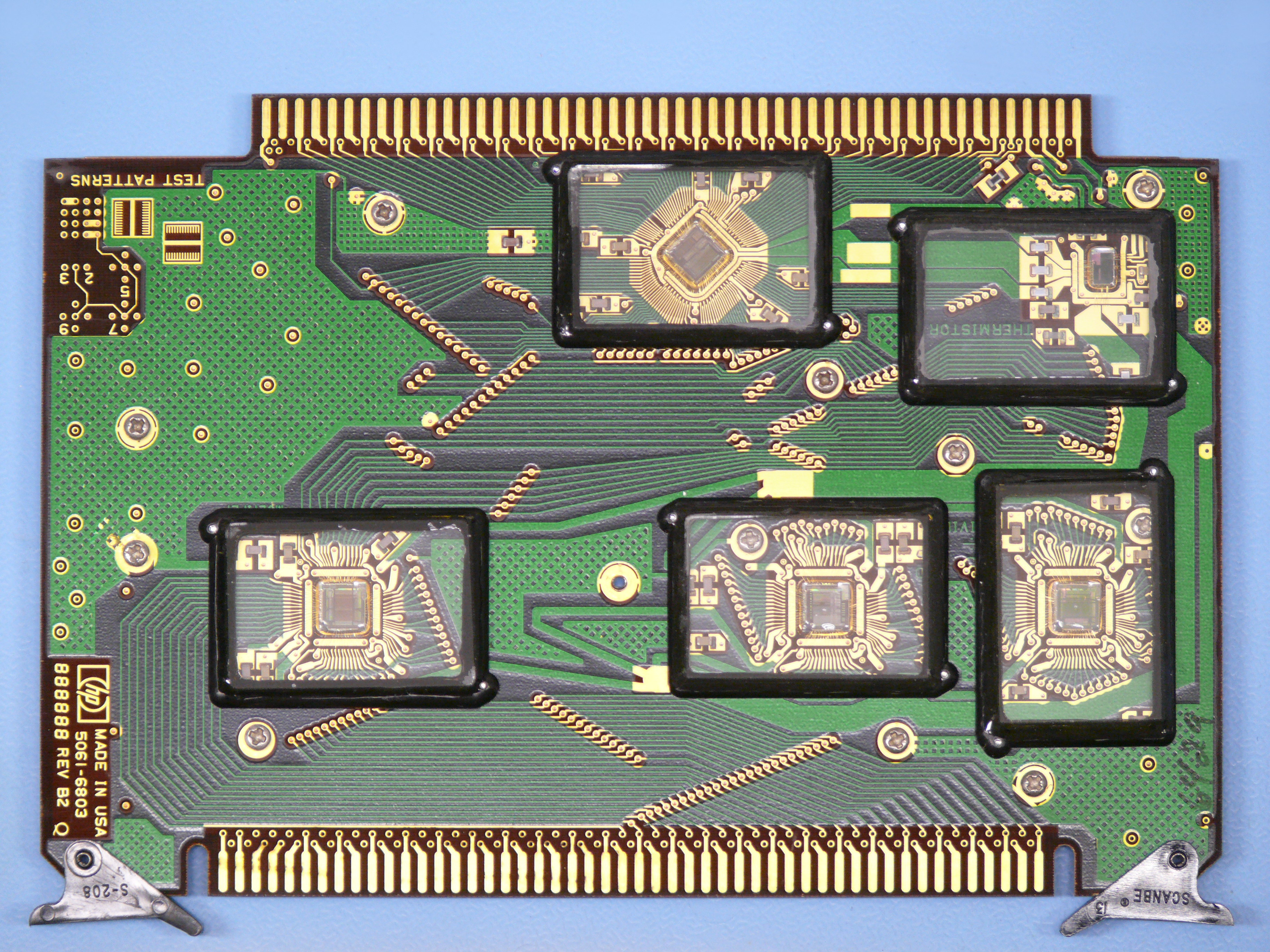
HP FOCUS processor and support chips on "finstrate" board

The Hewlett-Packard FOCUS microprocessor, launched in 1982, was the first commercial, single chip, fully 32-bit microprocessor available on the market. At this time, all 32-bit competitors (DEC, IBM, Prime Computer, etc.) used multi-chip bit-slice-CPU designs, while single-chip designs like the Motorola 68000 were a mix of 32 and 16-bit.

Introduced in the Hewlett-Packard HP 9000 Series 500 workstations and servers (originally launched as the HP 9020 and also, unofficially, called HP 9000 Series 600), the single-chip CPU was used alongside the I/O Processor (IOP), Memory Controller (MMU), Clock, and a number of 128-kilobit dynamic RAM devices as the basis of the HP 9000 system architecture. It was a 32-bit implementation of the 16-bit HP 3000 computer's stack architecture, with over 220 instructions (some 32 bits wide, some 16 bits wide), a segmented memory model, and no general purpose programmer-visible registers. The design of the FOCUS CPU was richly inspired by the custom silicon on sapphire (SOS) chip design HP used in their HP 3000 series machines.

Because of the high density of HP's NMOS-III IC process, heat dissipation was a problem. Therefore, the chips were mounted on special printed circuit boards, with a ~1 mm copper sheet at its core, called "finstrates".

The Focus CPU is microcoded with a 9,216 by 38-bit microcode control store. Internal data paths and registers are all 32-bit wide. The Focus CPU has a transistor count of 450,000 FETs.
