= Starbase =

Starbase, Star Base, or, variation, may also refer to:

== Science fiction ==
- a space station or habitat

== Places ==
- SpaceX Starbase, Cameron County, Texas, USA; a spaceport located at Boca Chica in the city of Starbase
- Starbase, Texas, United States; a city in Cameron County at Boca Chica containing the Starbase spaceport
- SpaceX Starbase, Louisiana, United States; a planned spaceport located in Vermilion Parish

== Computing and software ==
- StarBase (biological database), an RNA database
- StarBase, a StarOffice database application
- Starbase (video game), a space themed multiplayer video game
- Starbase, a proprietary graphics API for HP-UX

== Other uses ==
- STARBASE, a math and science educational program for students

== See also ==
- Starbase 12, a starbase in the video game Star Trek: Bridge Commander
- "Starbase 80?!", a season 5 episode of Star Trek: Lower Decks
- Basestar, a Cylon capital ship, a spacecraft carrier shaped like a star from Battlestar Galactica
- Star fort, a fortress shaped like a star
- Base (disambiguation)
- Star (disambiguation)
