= Runway bus =

Front-side bus by Hewlett-Packard

The Runway bus is a front-side bus developed by Hewlett-Packard for use by its PA-RISC microprocessor family. The Runway bus is a 64-bit wide, split transaction, time multiplexed address and data bus running at 120 MHz. This scheme was chosen by HP as they determined that a bus using separate address and data wires would have only delivered 20% more bandwidth for a 50% increase in pin count, which would have made microprocessors using the bus more expensive. The Runway bus was introduced with the release of the PA-7200 and was subsequently used by the PA-8000, PA-8200, PA-8500, PA-8600 and PA-8700 microprocessors. Early implementations of the bus used in the PA-7200, PA-8000 and PA-8200 had a theoretical bandwidth of 960 MB/s. Beginning with the PA-8500, the Runway bus was revised to transmit on both rising and falling edges of a 125 MHz clock signal, which increased its theoretical bandwidth to 2 GB/s. The Runway bus was succeeded with the introduction of the PA-8800, which used the Itanium 2 bus.

Bus features

- 64-bit multiplexed address/data
- 20 bus protocol signals
- Supports cache coherency
- Three frequency options (1.0, 0.75 and 0.67 of CPU clock — 0.50 apparently was later added)
- Parity protection on address/data and control signal
- Each attached device contains its own arbitrator logic
- Split transactions, up to six transactions can be pending at once
- Snooping cache coherency protocol
- 1-4 processors "glueless" multi-processing (no support chips needed)
- 768 MB/s sustainable throughput, peak 960 MB/s at 120 MHz
- Runway+/Runway DDR: On PA-8500, PA-8600 and PA-8700, the bus operates in DDR (double data rate) mode,
- resulting in a peak bandwidth of about 2.0 GB/s (Runway+ or Runway DDR) with 125 MHz

Most machines use the Runway bus to connect the CPUs directly to the IOMMU (Astro, U2/Uturn or Java) and memory. However, the N class and L3000 servers use an interface chip called Dew to bridge the Runway bus to the Merced bus that connects to the IOMMU and memory.
