= List of microprocessors =

This is a list of microprocessors.

== Altera ==
- Nios 16-bit (soft processor)
- Nios II 32-bit (soft processor)

== AMD ==
- List of AMD K5 processors
- List of AMD Athlon processors
- List of AMD Athlon 64 processors
- List of AMD Athlon XP processors
- List of AMD Duron processors
- List of AMD Opteron processors
- List of AMD Sempron processors
- List of AMD Turion processors
- List of AMD Athlon X2 processors
- List of AMD Phenom processors
- List of AMD FX processors
- List of AMD Ryzen processors

== Apollo ==
- PRISM

== ARM ==
- ARM

== Atmel ==
- AVR32
- AVR

== AT&T ==
- Hobbit

== Bell Labs ==
- Bellmac 32

== BLX IC Design Corporation ==
- Godson/Loongson

== Broadcom ==
- XLS 200 series multicore processor

== Centaur Technology/IDT ==
- WinChip

== Computer Cowboys ==
- Sh-Boom

== Cyrix ==
- 486, 5x86, 6x86

== Data General ==
- microNOVA mN601 and mN602
- microECLIPSE

== Centre for Development of Advanced Computing ==
- VEGA Microprocessors

== Digital Equipment Corporation ==
- DEC T-11
- DEC J-11
- DEC V-11
- MicroVAX 78032
- CVAX
- Rigel
- Mariah
- NVAX
- Alpha 21064
- Alpha 21164
- Alpha 21264
- Alpha 21364
- StrongARM

== DM&P Electronics ==
- Vortex86

== Emotion Engine by Sony & Toshiba ==
- Emotion Engine

== Elbrus ==
- Elbrus 2K (VLIW design)

== Electronic Arrays ==
- Electronic Arrays 9002

== EnSilica ==
- eSI-RISC

== Fairchild Semiconductor ==
- 9440
- F8
- Clipper

== Freescale Semiconductor (formerly Motorola) ==
- List of Freescale products

== Fujitsu ==
- FR
- FR-V
- SPARC64 V

== Garrett AiResearch/American Microsystems ==
- MP944

== Google ==
- Tensor processing unit

== Harris Semiconductor ==
- Harris RTX2000

== Hewlett-Packard ==
- Capricorn (microprocessor)
- FOCUS 32-bit stack architecture
- PA-7000 PA-RISC Version 1.0 (32-bit)
- PA-7100 PA-RISC Version 1.1
- PA-7100LC
- PA-7150
- PA-7200
- PA-7300LC
- PA-8000 PA-RISC Version 2.0 (64-bit)
- PA-8200
- PA-8500
- PA-8600
- PA-8700
- PA-8800
- PA-8900
- Saturn Nibble CPU (4-bit)

== Hitachi ==
- SuperH SH-1/SH-2 etc.

== Inmos ==
- Transputer T2/T4/T8

== IBM ==
- 1977 – OPD Mini Processor
- 1986 – IBM ROMP
- 2000 – Gekko processor
- 2005 – Xenon processor
- 2006 – Cell processor
- 2006 – Broadway processor
- 2012 – Espresso processor
- 2016 – IBM Q processors

=== POWER ===
- 1990 – POWER1
- 1992 – RISC Single Chip
- 1993 – POWER2
- 1996 – P2SC
- 1998 – POWER3
- 2001 – POWER4
- 2004 – POWER5
- 2007 – POWER6
- 2010 – POWER7
- 2013 – POWER8
- 2017 – POWER9
- 2020 – Power10

=== PowerPC-AS ===
- 1995 – A10
- 1996 – A25 and A30
- 1997 – RS64
- 1998 – RS64-II
- 1999 – RS64-III
- 2000 – RS64-IV

=== z/Architecture ===
- 2008 – IBM z10
- 2010 – IBM z196
- 2012 – IBM zEC12
- 2015 – IBM z13
- 2017 – IBM z14
- 2019 – IBM z15
- 2021 – IBM Telum

== IIT-M ==
- SHAKTI - Microprocessor & Microcontroller

== Intel ==
- Intel 4004 (first commercially available microprocessor)
- List of Intel Core processors
  - List of Intel Core 2 processors
  - List of Intel Core i3 processors
  - List of Intel Core i5 processors
  - List of Intel Core i7 processors
  - List of Intel Core i9 processors
  - List of Intel Core M processors
- List of Intel Pentium processors
  - List of Intel Pentium Pro processors
  - List of Intel Pentium II processors
  - List of Intel Pentium III processors
  - List of Intel Pentium 4 processors
  - List of Intel Pentium M processors
  - List of Intel Pentium D processors
- List of Intel Celeron processors
- List of Intel Atom processors
- List of Intel Xeon processors
- List of Intel Itanium processors

== Intersil ==
- 6100 (12-bit)
- RTX2010

== ISRO ==
- Vikram 1601

== Lattice Semiconductor ==
- LatticeMico8 8-bit (soft processor)
- LatticeMico32 32-bit (soft processor)

== MIPS Technologies ==
- R2000
- R3000
- R3000A
- R6000
- R4000
- R4400
- R8000
- R10000
- R12000
- R14000
- R16000
- R18000

== MOS Technology ==
- 6502 family

== National Semiconductor ==
- IMP-16
- PACE
- SC/MP
- NSC800
- NS320xx

== NCR ==
- NCR/32

== NEC ==
- μPD707/μPD708
- μCOM-4
- NEC V20
- NEC V25
- NEC V30/V33
- NEC V40
- NEC V50
- NEC V60/V70/V80
- NEC μPD7220
- NEC μPD96050
- μPD765/μPD765A
- μPD7720/μPD77C25
- μPD780C/μPD780C-1
- R4200
- V850

== Novix ==
- NC4016 (originally called the NC4000)

== NVIDIA ==
- Tegra family

== NXP (formerly Philips Semiconductors) ==
- Signetics 2650

== OpenCores ==
- OpenRISC family

== Oracle Corporation (formerly Sun Microsystems) ==
- SPARC

== Panafacom ==
- PANAFACOM-16A (originally MN1610)

== Plessey Microsystems ==
- MIPROC 16

== RCA ==
- 1802

== Renesas Electronics ==
- M32R

== RISC-V Foundation ==
- RISC-V

== Rise Technology ==
- mP6

== Sunway ==
- SW-1 / SW-2 / SW-3 / SW1600 / SW26010

== STMicroelectronics ==
- STM32 series

== Tesla ==
- Tesla D1

== Texas Instruments ==
- Texas Instruments TMS320
- Texas Instruments TMS1000 – used in the TI-35, Big Trak, and Speak & Spell
- Texas Instruments TMS1100 – used in the Microvision
- Texas Instruments TMS3556 – a graphics chip used in the EXL 100
- Texas Instruments TMS7000 - 8-bit microcontroller, 256 bytes of RAM
- Texas Instruments TMS7020 – used in the EXL 100, Singapore Teleview
- Texas Instruments TMS9900

== Toshiba ==
- Cell
- Toshiba TLCS microcontrollers: TLCS-12, TLCS-48, TLCS-Z80, TLCS-90, TLCS-870, TLCS-900

== Transmeta ==
- Crusoe
- Efficeon

== VIA ==
- List of VIA microprocessors
- List of VIA C3 microprocessors
- List of VIA C7 microprocessors
- List of VIA Eden microprocessors

== Western Design Center ==
- 65C02 (8-bit)
- 65816/65802 (16-bit)

== Western Digital ==
- MCP-1600
  - LSI-11
  - WD16
  - Pascal MicroEngine

== Western Electric ==
- WE-32000 (Rebranded Bellmac 32, used in the 3B series computers)

== Xilinx ==
- PicoBlaze 8-bit (soft processor)
- MicroBlaze 32-bit (soft processor)

== Zilog ==
- Zilog
- Z80 architecture
- Zilog Z800
- Zilog Z8000
- Zilog Z80000

== See also ==
- List of Intel cores
