= Convex Computer =

American computer manufacturer

Convex Computer Corporation
- Company type: Private
- Industry: Supercomputers
- Founded: 1982; 44 years ago in Richardson, Texas
- Founder: Bob Paluck; Steve Wallach
- Defunct: 1995
- Fate: Acquired by Hewlett-Packard

Convex Computer Corporation was a company that developed, manufactured and marketed vector minisupercomputers and supercomputers for small-to-medium-sized businesses. Their later Exemplar series of parallel computing machines were based on the Hewlett-Packard (HP) PA-RISC microprocessors, and in 1995, HP bought the company. Exemplar machines were offered for sale by HP for some time, and Exemplar technology was used in HP's V-Class machines.

== History ==
Convex was formed in 1982 by Bob Paluck and Steve Wallach in Richardson, Texas. It was originally named Parsec and early prototype and production boards bear that name. They planned on producing a machine very similar in architecture to the Cray Research vector processor machines, with a somewhat lower performance, but with a much better price–performance ratio. In order to lower costs, the Convex designs were not as technologically aggressive as Cray's, and were based on more mainstream chip technology, attempting to make up for the loss in performance in other ways.

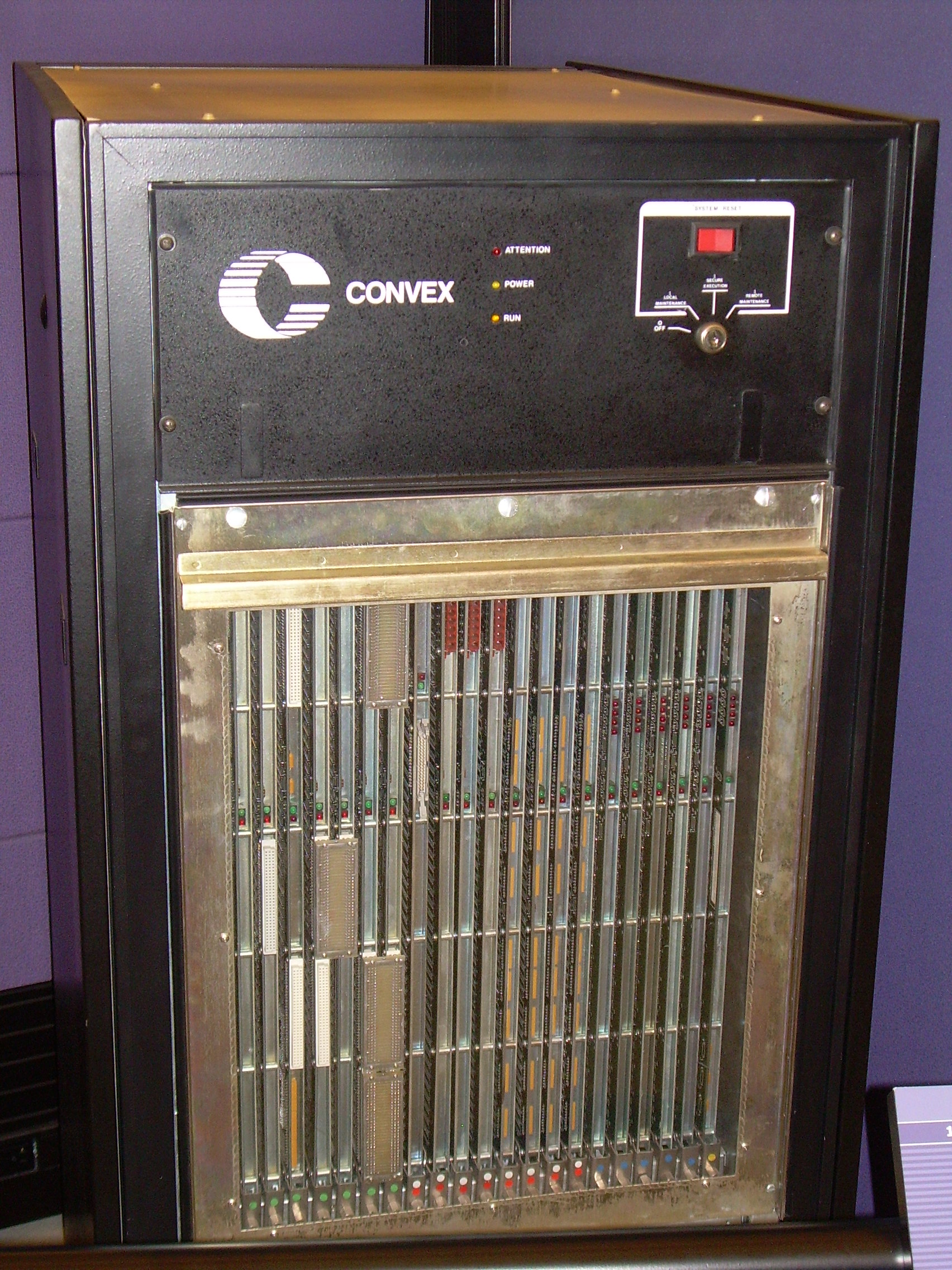
Convex C-1 (1985)

Their first machine was the C1, released in 1985. The C1 was very similar to the Cray-1 in general design, but its CPU and main memory was implemented with slower but less expensive CMOS technology. They offset this by increasing the capabilities of the vector units, including doubling the vector registers' length to 128 64-bit elements each. It also used virtual memory as opposed to the static memory system of the Cray machines, which improved programming. It was generally rated at 20 MFLOPS peak for double precision (64-bit), and 40 MFLOPS peak for single precision (32-bit), about one fifth the normal speed of the Cray-1. They also invested heavily in advanced automatic vectorizing compilers in order to gain performance when existing programs were ported to its systems. The machines ran a BSD version of Unix known initially as Convex Unix then later as ConvexOS due to trademark and licensing issues. ConvexOS has DEC VMS compatibility features, known by the product name of COVUE (CONVEX-to-VAX User Environment), as well as Cray Fortran features. Their Fortran compiler went on to be licensed to other computers such as Ardent Computer and Stellar (and merged Stardent).

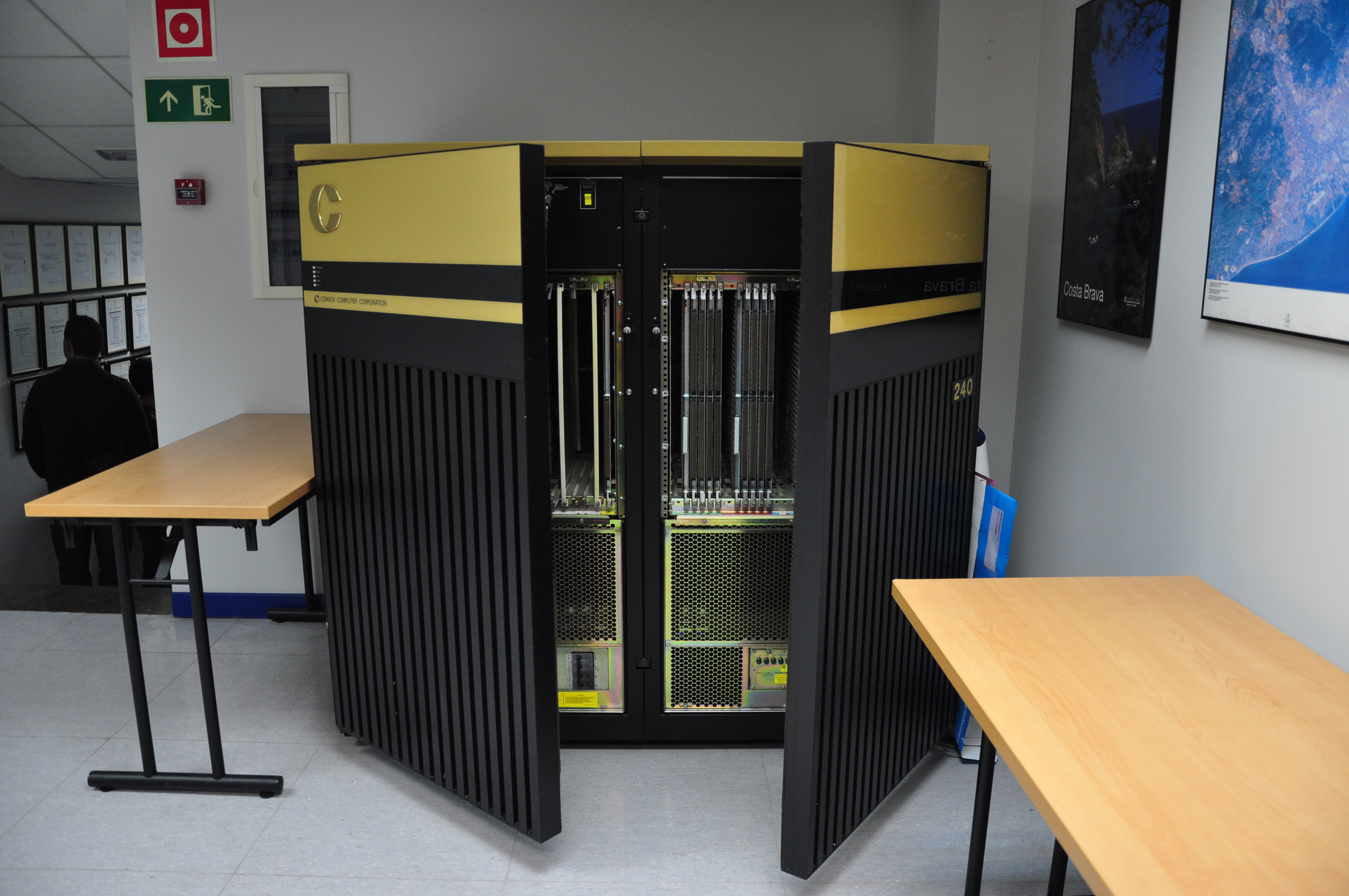
Convex 240 supercomputer (1988))

The C2 was a crossbar-interconnected multiprocessor version of the C1, with up to four CPUs, released in 1988. It used newer 20,000-gate CMOS and 10,000-gate emitter-coupled logic (ECL) gate arrays for a boost in clock speed from 10 MHz to 25 MHz, and rated at 50 MFLOPS peak for double precision per CPU (100 MFLOPS peak for single precision). It was Convex's most successful product.

The C2 was followed by the C3 in 1991, being essentially similar to the C2 but with a faster clock and support for up to eight CPUs implemented with low-density GaAs FPGAs. Various configurations of the C3 were offered, with 50 to 240 MFLOPS per CPU. However, the C3 and the Convex business model were overtaken by changes in the computer industry. The arrival of RISC microprocessors meant that it was no longer possible to develop cost-effective high-performance computing as a standalone small low-volume company. While the C3 was delivered late, which resulted in lost sales, it was still not going to be able to compete with commodity high-performance computing in the long run.

Another speed boost used in the C3 and C4, which moved the hardware implementation to GaAs-based chips, following an evolution identical to that of the Cray machines, but the effort was too little, too late. Some considered the whole C4 program to be nothing more than chasing a business in decline. By this time, even though Convex was the first vendor to ship a GaAs based product, it was losing money.

In 1994, Convex introduced an entirely new design, known as the Exemplar. Unlike the C-series vector computer, the Exemplar was a parallel-computing machine that used the HP PA-7100 processor in the SPP1000 series, followed by HP PA-7200 microprocessors in the SPP1200 series, connected together using SCI. First dubbed MPP, these machines were later called SPP and Exemplar and sold under the SPP-1600 moniker. The expectation was that a software programming model for parallel computing could draw in customers. But the type of customers Convex attracted believed in Fortran and brute force rather than sophisticated technology. The operating system also had terrible performance problems which could not easily be fixed. Eventually, Convex established a working partnership with HP's hardware and software divisions. Initially it was intended that the Exemplar would be binary-compatible with HP's HP-UX operating system but eventually it was decided to port HP-UX to the platform and sell the platform as standalone servers.

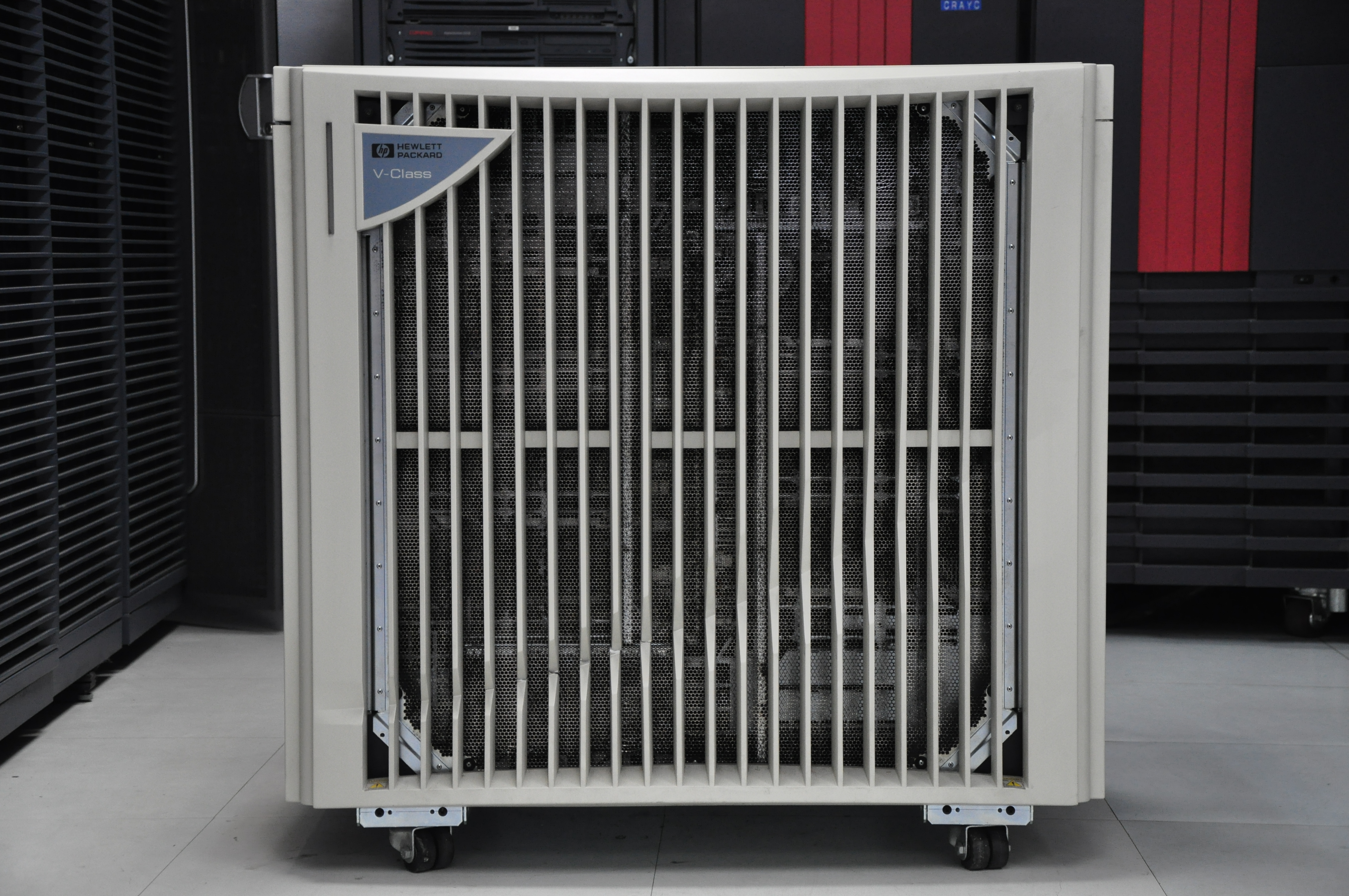
HP V-Class computer.

In 1995, Hewlett-Packard bought Convex. HP sold Convex Exemplar machines under the S-Class (MP) and X-Class (CC-NUMA) titles, and later incorporated some of Exemplar's technology into the V-Class machine, which was released running the HP-UX 11.0 release instead of the SPP-UX version which was sold with the S- and X-Class products.

== C-series architecture ==
The processor architecture of the C-series models is broadly similar across the entire range. Machine instructions can be 16, 32, 48 or 64 bits in length, situated on half-word (two-byte) boundaries. Standard instructions are one to three half-words, with extended instructions prefixed with an extra half-word value, being of two to four half-words in total length.

Three general-purpose register sets are provided, these providing eight address, eight scalar, and eight vector accumulator registers respectively, with each set expanded in the C4600 series to 32 address, 28 scalar, and 16 vector accumulator registers respectively. A number of special-purpose vector, scalar stride, and control registers are also provided, exposing the program counter and processor status word.
