= Ruby B. Lee =

American electrical engineer

Ruby Bei-Loh Lee is an American electrical engineer who is currently the Forrest G. Hamrick Professor in Engineering and Professor of Electrical and Computer Engineering at Princeton University. Her contributions to computer architecture include work in reduced instruction set computing, embedded systems, and hardware support for computer security and digital media. At Princeton, she is the director of the Princeton Architecture Laboratory for Multimedia and Security. Tech executive Joel S. Birnbaum has called her "one of the top instruction-set architects in the world".

== Education and career ==
Lee graduated from Cornell University's College Scholar Program in 1973. She went to Stanford University for her graduate studies, earning a master's degree in computer science and computer engineering in 1975, and a doctorate in electrical engineering in 1980. After briefly teaching at Stanford, she joined Hewlett-Packard in 1981, eventually becoming a chief architect there in 1992, and holding a consulting faculty position at Stanford from 1989 until 1998. She moved to Princeton as the Hamrick Professor in 1998, becoming at that time one of only three female full professors in engineering at Princeton, and the only one to hold an endowed chair.

== Contributions ==
At Hewlett-Packard, Lee designed the PA-RISC architecture and microprocessors based on it, and the multimedia components of the IA-64 (Itanium) architecture. Much of her work since moving to Princeton has concerned both the integration of pervasive security mechanisms into computer architecture, and the hardware support for bit manipulation based cryptographic primitives.

== Awards and honors ==
In 2001 Lee was elected as a Fellow of the Association for Computing Machinery "for pioneering multimedia instructions in general-purpose processor architecture and innovations in the design and implementation of the instruction set architecture of RISC processors." She also became a Fellow of the Institute of Electrical and Electronics Engineers in 2002. She was elected as a member of the American Academy of Arts and Sciences in 2020.
