= Singapore Teleview =

Singaporean videotex service

- Developer: Telecom Authority of Singapore, GEC Marconi
- Type: Videotex
- Launched: 1991; 35 years ago
- Platform: CEPT Videotext Services Recommendations T/CD 6-1
- Operating system: Metacomco BASIC

Singapore Teleview was a Singaporean videotext service. In the mid 1980s, the Telecom Authority of Singapore entered into a joint venture development with GEC Marconi in the UK to develop a photo-videotext public service. Selected engineers were sent to the UK to work within the Marconi development team stationed at Fleet, Hampshire, England. Singapore was the first country in the world to launch an interactive information service to the public which included photographic images. The service started trials during late 1987 using specifically designed terminals. Controlled trials had been conducted since 1987 as the infrastructure was installed and trialed successfully. It finally went into full public service in 1991.

Subscribers connected to the Teleview, now-defunct, service by SingTel, via a dial-up connection initially by 1200–2400 baud modems (v.22bis) and then later via 9600-14400 kbit/s modems. Pages with photographic images were sent to the terminal by full-field teletext transmissions from dedicated data inserters/UHF TV transmitters.

Subscribers initially paid no time based usage fee for this service. However, later charges, on top of telephone line charges were levied.

A later development from Teleview provided an interfaced connection to the Internet, subscribers were given access to the Internet via a text-only terminal; email was accessed by Pine, and webpages were viewed by Lynx. Subsequently, Teleview was rendered obsolete, and SingNet started offering to the Internet via Serial Line Internet Protocol/Point-to-Point Protocol (SLIP/PPP) over modem.

== System ==
The information storage and delivery system was based upon GPT4190 computers coupled to dial in modem for public to access and via microwave link to a UHF TV transmitter fitted with full-field teletext inserters. Transmission of lower-level protocol data and user terminal management control was via telephone V.22 modem. High-level data such as geometric and photographic displays sent exclusively by full-field teletext with interchange control and handshaking via V.22 modem.

The service profile is based upon extensions to the existing CEPT Videotext Services Recommendations T/CD 6-1, as defined in Teleview Videotext Service Profile and Data Standard Ref; 7630/DS/1 1987.

== Terminal ==
The terminal was based upon two Motorola 68000 processors: one as a general main computer and control and the other as a video processor interfaced to VRAM with shift register to output. Another processor, the TMS 7000, acted as control for the full-field teletext, RF tuning and packet decoding for 8-bit data transfer to the main processor, while a Micronas MAS2122 Modem chipset handled the telephone interface.

RF Tuning was achieved by Telefunken multi-band tuner, voltage tuned via SP5000 with the channel selection supplied by the TMS 7000. This tuner with AGC IF detection provides the composite video to the data slicer (TMS 3556) and data detector/converter (TMS 3551) under control from the TMS 7000 (TMS 77C82 mask programmed version).

Furthermore, the main processor operated as a computer running MetaComCo BASIC, with keyboard entry via an infrared-coupled standard QWERTY keyboard with additional keys to select videotext, teletext or PC modes.

== See also ==
- Internet in Singapore
- Minitel
- Prestel
