= GSC bus =

GSC
- Created by: Hewlett-Packard
- Width in bits: 32
- Speed: 40 MHz

GSC is a bus used in many of the HP 9000 workstations and servers. The acronym has various explanations, including Gecko System Connect (Gecko being the codename of the 712 workstation), Gonzo System Connect and General System Connect.

GSC was a general 32-bit I/O bus, similar to NuBus or Sun's SBus, although it was also used as a processor bus with the PA-7100LC and PA-7300LC processors. Several variations were produced over time, the later ones running at 40 MHz:

GSC-1X
The original GSC bus implemented on PA-7100LC and used in the Gecko (712), Mirage (715) and Electra computers. Peak Bandwidth 142 MB/s w/DMA, 106 MB/s with PIO writes.

GSC+, a.k.a. "Extended GSC" or "EGSC"
Enhancements added for KittyHawk/SkyHawk (U2 chip) that allow for pending transactions. GSC+ enhancements are orthogonal to the GSC-1.5X and GSC-2X enhancements.

GSC-1.5X
GSC-1X with an additional variable length write transaction.

GSC-2X
GSC-1.5X with a protocol enhancement to allow data to be sent at double the GCLK rate, with a peak bandwidth of 256 MB/s.

HSC
High Speed Connect.

Four types of GSC cards were produced: the GIO cards fit into the larger of the two IO card sockets in the 712 workstation. Several were produced, including a second RS-232 serial port, a serial/10BaseT combo, a second graphics card and a Token Ring card.

The 715/Mirage, 725, 735, 755, B-, C-, and J-class workstations, and the D- and R-class servers, used the so-called "EISA form factor". Many different types of card were produced, including Gigabit Ethernet, single and dual 100 Mbit Ethernet, Ultra-2 SCSI, ATM and graphics.

The K- and T-class servers both used the "3x5" form factor, although the different brackets prevent the cards being interchangeable. Fibre channel and Gigabit Ethernet cards both exist.

== See also ==
- List of device bandwidths
