= Marathon Technologies =

American server software company, 1993–2012

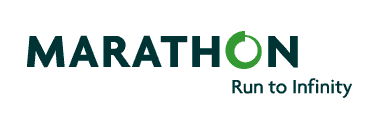
- Type: Private
- Industry: Software
- Founded: 1993
- Defunct: 2012
- Fate: Acquired by Stratus Technologies
- Headquarters: Littleton, Massachusetts, United States
- Key people: Mr. Bruce Berger, CEO
- Products: everRun HA everRun FT everRun VM everRun MX everRun CDP
- Revenue: Not disclosed
- Website: www.MarathonTechnologies.com

Marathon Technologies Corp. was a software company based in Littleton, Massachusetts, founded in 1993. The company specialised in fault-tolerant and high availability software for Windows/Intel server environments, allowing multiple commodity servers to operate as a single fault-tolerant system. It was founded by engineers and executives who had worked on Digital Equipment Corporation's VAXft fault-tolerant systems. Marathon Technologies was acquired by Stratus Technologies in September 2012.

== History ==
The company was established in 1993 by a team drawn from Digital Equipment Corporation's VAXft programme, applying that experience to the commodity Windows/Intel server market. The founders developed software and networking technology that enabled multiple standard x86 servers to function together as a single fault-tolerant system — extending enterprise-grade reliability to off-the-shelf hardware.

In 2004, Marathon migrated its technology to a software-only product line called everRun, designed to run on standard x86 servers from Intel and AMD running Windows Server 2003 and unmodified Windows applications, without requiring specialised hardware.

In 2007, Marathon announced the v-Available initiative, addressing high availability for server virtualisation environments. The company released everRun VM for Citrix XenServer in spring 2008, providing fault-tolerant availability and disaster recovery protection for virtualised workloads.

In late 2010, Marathon released everRun MX, a software-based fault-tolerant solution for symmetric multiprocessing and multi-core servers.

Marathon Technologies received venture funding from Atlas Venture, Longworth Venture Partners and Sierra Ventures. The company maintained offices in the United States, Europe and Asia. In September 2012, Marathon Technologies was acquired by Stratus Technologies.
