= Penguin Solutions =

American technology company

- Logo
- Type: Public
- Traded as: Nasdaq: PENG; S&P 600 component
- Industry: Semiconductors
- Founded: 1988; 38 years ago
- Headquarters: Fremont, California, U.S.
- Area served: Worldwide
- Key people: Kash Shaikh (CEO); Nate Olmstead (CFO)
- Revenue: ▲US$1.50 billion (2026)
- Operating income: ▲US$122.8 million (2026)
- Net income: ▲US$75.91 million (2026)
- Number of employees: 2,900 (2026)
- Website: penguinsolutions.com

Penguin Solutions is an American technology company headquartered in Fremont, California. The company was first founded in 1988 as SMART Modular Technologies. The company rebranded to SMART Global Holdings (SGH) and held an initial public offering in 2017, after spending years as a subsidiary of other companies or as its own private company. In October 2024, the company rebranded as Penguin Solutions.

The company specializes in artificial intelligence (AI) infrastructure, high-performance computing (HPC), and memory solutions. Penguin Solutions is included on the S&P 600. The company operates with manufacturing sites, labs, and offices across the United States, Europe, Asia, and South America.

Established as a specialty memory company in 1988, the company has expanded to include accelerated computing solutions, AI factory platform solutions, integrated memory products, fault-tolerant edge computing platforms, cluster management software, and managed services. Penguin Solutions combines its technologies with solutions from industry partners to provide full-stack AI infrastructure platforms for enterprises, sovereign AI initiatives, and cloud service providers. These solutions support AI training, inference, and agentic AI workloads.

== History ==
=== Foundation and early years (1988−2016) ===
In 1988, SMART Modular Technologies was founded with an initial focus on specialized Dynamic random-access memory (DRAM) modules for industrial and enterprise OEMs. In 1995, SMART Modular Technologies acquired Apex Data. Later that year, the company went public for the first time. In 1999, SMART Modular Technologies was acquired by Solectron Corp for roughly $2 billion. In 2004, the company was acquired from Solectron by TPG Capital (now TPG Inc.), Francisco Partners Management, and Shah Capital Partners for $100 million. In 2011, the company was acquired and taken private by the private equity firm Silver Lake Partners for approximately $645 million.

=== SGH years and expansion (2017−2023) ===
In conjunction with its initial public offering (IPO) on the NASDAQ in May 2017, SMART Modular Technologies rebranded to SMART Global Holdings, Inc. (SGH) in May 2017. Following the change, SGH functioned as the parent company, with SMART Modular Technologies acting as its operating subsidiary. In 2018, SGH acquired Penguin Computing for $85 million, marking the company's entry into the HPC and AI markets. The following year, SGH acquired Artesyn Computing and Inforce Computing, for $80 million and $12 million respectively.

In 2020, Penguin Computing collaborated with AMD to deliver supercomputing clusters to New York University, MIT, and Rice University for COVID-19 research.

In March 2021, SGH completed the acquisition of Wolfspeed's (then known as Cree, Inc.)'s LED products business unit. The acquisition was for nearly $300 million, diversifying SGH's portfolio into specialty lighting.

In January 2022, Penguin worked with Meta Platforms to deploy the latter's supercomputer, dubbed the "AI Research SuperCluster" (RSC). Penguin had consistently collaborated with Meta, providing architecture and managed services for the company; the RSC ran on Penguin's Altus servers. In February, Penguin Computing was inducted into the Space Technology Hall of Fame for its role in commercializing the Beowulf HPC clustering architecture, after its acquisition of Scyld Computing.

The "Penguin Solutions" branding was created in April 2022, combining the Penguin Computing and Penguin Edge brands into one umbrella within Intelligent Platform Solutions, itself an SGH business line. In June, SGH acquired Stratus Technologies for $225 million. Founded in 1980, Startus was known for providing high availability and fault-tolerant computing solutions to a broad clientele.

In 2023, Penguin was certified as an NVIDIA "DGX-Ready Managed Services Partner".

In 2024, SK Telecom invested $200 million in SGH, to establish more concrete cooperation across the AI infrastructure business, including AI data center, edge AI, and future memory solutions. Also in 2024, the company designed, built, and deployed the AI infrastructure and high-performance computing environment for Georgia Tech's AI makerspace, in collaboration with NVIDIA.

=== Rebranding as Penguin Solutions (2024−present) ===
On October 15, 2024, SGH announced it would be rebranding to Penguin Solutions, with the process formally completed on April 23, 2025. With the rebrand completed, the company's stock ticker changed from SGH to PENG. SMART Modular Technologies and Stratus Technologies now operate as product brands under the Penguin Solutions name. Cree LED is a brand owned by Penguin Solutions that offers application-specific LED chips and components.

In August 2025, Penguin Solutions provided its automatic identification and data capture (AIDC) solutions to SK Telecom for the launch of its sovereign AI infrastructure in South Korea.

By 2026, the company was known for "designing, building, deploying, and managing" artificial intelligence (AI) infrastructure. In March 2026, Penguin Solutions announced its partnership with Deepgram and Dell Technologies on the development of infrastructure for Deepgram's enterprise voice AI.

In 2026, Penguin Solutions built the Spectra supercomputer, deployed under Sandia National Laboratories, with 128 Maverick-2 accelerators from NextSilicon using Penguin's OCP-based Tundra servers.

== Corporate leadership structure ==
Kash Shaikh has served as the company's president and CEO since February 2026. Shaikh succeeded Mark Adams, who served in the two roles, and was also the company's director from 2020 to 2026. In August 2025, Penguin Solutions appointed Tony Frey as SVP and Chief Revenue Officer, and Ted Gillick as SVP of Strategy and Corporate Development. In March 2026, the company appointed Ian Colle as its Chief Product Officer (CPO). Nate Olmstead currently serves as the company's Chief Financial Officer, as of June 2024.

== Industry awards and recognition ==
- In November 2024, Penguin Solutions earned a spot in the HPCwire Readers' Choice Awards (2024), on the Editors' Choice list for the "Top 5 Vendors to Watch".
- In January 2025, Penguin's Stratus Technologies brand won an award from the 2025 BIG Innovation Awards for its Stratus ztC Endurance platform.
- In February 2025, Penguin Solutions won the "Best Hybrid Cloud Solution for Clusterware" award for 2024/2025 from The Cloud Awards.
- In March 2025, Penguin Solutions' OriginAI infrastructure solution won a BIG AI Excellence Award in the "Internet & Technology" category.
- In April 2025, Stratus Technologies won the "HPC Solution of the Year" award from the Data Breakthrough Awards Program.
- In June 2025, Penguin's Cree LED brand won the "ETQ Innovation Excellence Award".
- In April 2026, Penguin Solutions was named on USA Today's Climate Leaders List.

== See also ==
- List of S&P 600 companies
