= Steven Muchnick =

American computer scientist

Steven Stanley Muchnick (1945-2020) was a noted computer science researcher, best known as author of the 1997 treatise on compilers, "Advanced Compiler Design and Implementation."

== Background ==
In 1974, Muchnick was awarded a PhD in computer science from Cornell University. After graduation, he became a professor at the University of Kansas, located in Lawrence, Kansas. During his tenure at that institution, he wrote several research papers, many of which were published in the Journal of the ACM.

Muchnick eventually departed from his teaching profession. He then went on to apply his knowledge of compilers as a vital member of the teams that developed two computer architectures — PA-RISC at Hewlett-Packard and SPARC at Sun Microsystems.

Upon completion of the initial work on each architecture, he served as the leader of the advanced compiler design and implementation groups for these systems.

Later Muchnick became involved in the prevention of HIV infections. In 2010 he was a member of the San Francisco HIV Prevention Planning Center.
