= EXL 100 =

French home computer released in 1984

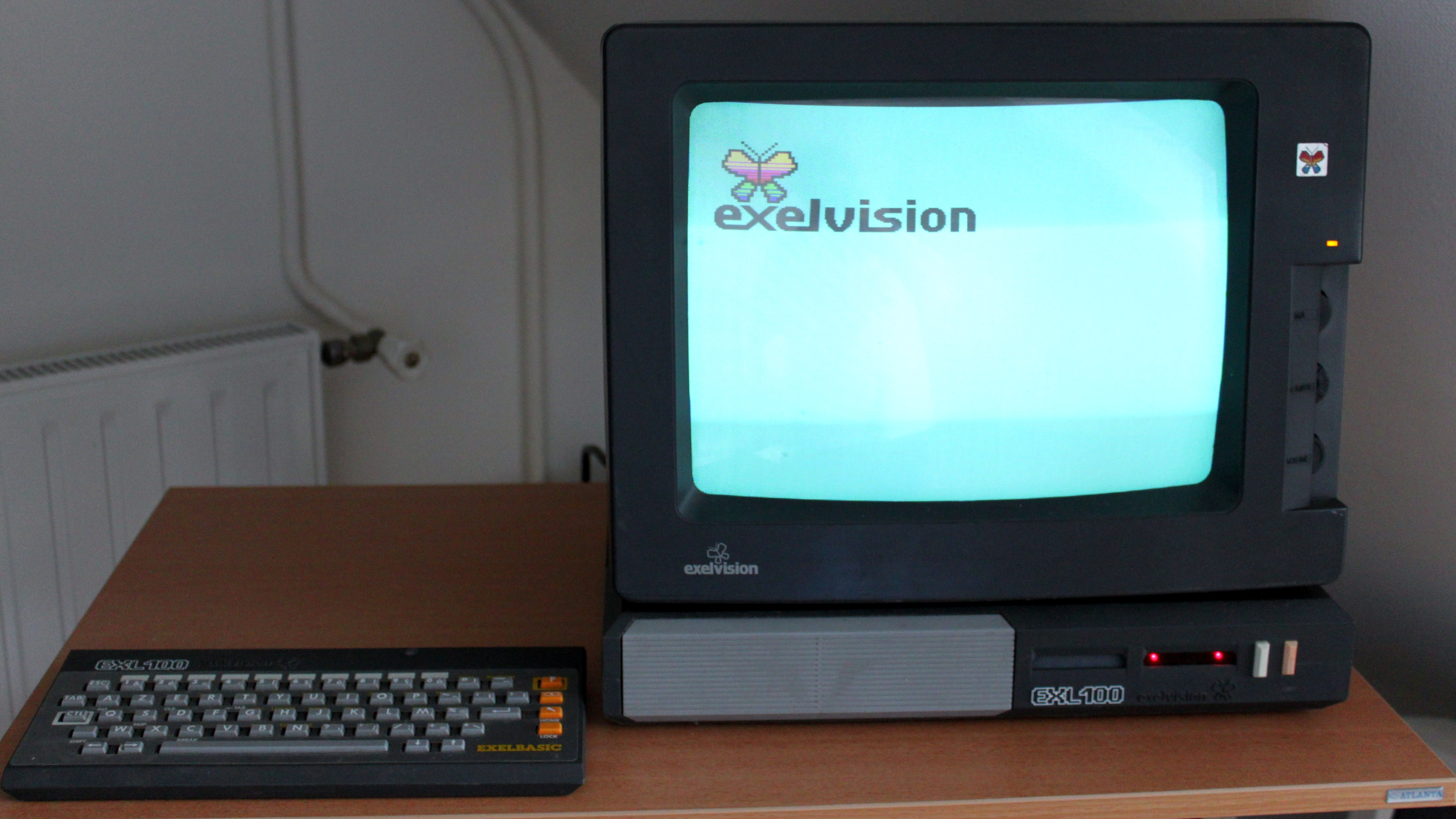
- Developer: Exelvision
- Type: Home computer
- Generation: 8-bit
- Released: France: 1984; 42 years ago
- Lifespan: 1984
- Introductory price: 3,190 FF
- Units sold: 9000 used in schools
- Media: Cassette tape, cartridges, floppy disk (optional)
- Operating system: None (ExelBasic on cartridge)
- CPU: TMS 7020 @ 4.9 MHz
- Memory: 34 KB RAM, 4 KB ROM
- Display: 40 × 25 character text mode, 320 × 250 pixel graphics mode, 8 colors
- Graphics: TMS 3556
- Sound: TMS 5220 (with speech synthesis in French)
- Successor: Exeltel

The EXL 100 is a computer released in 1984 by the French brand Exelvision, based on the TMS 7020 microprocessor from Texas Instruments. This was an uncommon design choice (at the time almost all home computers either used 6502 or Z80 microprocessors) but justified by the fact that the engineering team behind the machine (Jacques Palpacuer, Victor Zebrouck and Christian Petiot) came from Texas Instruments. It was part of the government Computing for All plan and 9000 units were used in schools.

== Design ==
The design is unusual compared with similar machines of the time, as it had a separate central unit. Two keyboards were available: one with rubber keys and another with a more standard touch. Keyboard and joystick were not connected to the central unit by a cable but by infrared link, and are battery powered. Many extensions were available: modem, floppy disk drive and a 16 KB CMOS RAM powered by an integrated lithium battery. Its TMS 5220 sound processor was capable of French speech synthesis, another unusual feature.

=== Specifications ===
- Release price: 3,190 French francs
- CPU: TMS 7020 at 4.9 MHz
- Graphics chip: TMS 3556 (40 × 25 character text mode, 320 × 250 pixel graphics mode, 8 colors)
- Sound: TMS 5220 (with speech synthesis in French)
- Storage: cartridge port, cassettes, optional floppy disk drive
- Memory: 34 KB RAM (2 KB RAM + 32 KB Shared VRAM), 4 to 32 KB ROM

=== Variants ===
A version with an integrated V23 modem named Exeltel was released in 1986.

== Software ==
The machine came with a BASIC version on cartridge named ExelBasic. There are more 140 games for the system.

There are 73 known commercial games released for the Exelvision EXL 100 computer.

Title	Year	Publisher
10000	198?	Minipuce
1000 Bornes	1985	Free Game Blot
Albertville Slalom Géant	1987	Editions Parallèles
Amiral Cup		Minipuce
Anaconda	198?	Exelvision
Arcade	198?	Editions Parallèles
ATI 42: Simulateur de Vol	1985	Minipuce
B-25	1987	Minipuce
Backgammon	1985	Editions Parallèles
Bugs Buster	1985	Free Game Blot
Burgertime	1987	Exelvision
Capitaine Menkar	1985	Exelvision
Car Crash	1986	Initiel
Casse Briques Puissance 5	1985	Exelvision
CB5: Casse Briques Puissance 5	1985	Exelvision
Cité d'Or	1985	Exelvision
Civil War	198?	Exelement Votre
Coloric	1984	Free Game Blot
Crapette	1985	Editions Parallèles
Des Signes dans l'Espace	1985	VIFI Nathan
Exel Jack	1985	Exelvision
Exel Max	198?	Exelvision
Exel Poker	1984	Electron Soft.
Formule 1	1987	Tilt
Golfachiffres	198?	Exelvision
Golphabet	1985	Minipuce
Grand Prix	1986	Editions Parallèles
Guppy	1985	Exelvision
Harward	1985	Sprites
Histoire de Theatre	1985	Free Game Blot
Imagix	1984	Exelvision
Kamicar 1	1987	Exelvision
Kong	1987	Exelvision
Kung-Fu	1985	Exelvision
La Tour de Hanoi	1985	Minipuce
L'Anneau de l'Union	1985	Initiel
Le Monde de Pat	1985	Exelvision
Le Sphinx d'Or	1987	Editions Parallèles
Le Trésor de Tout Ankh Amon	198?	Editions Parallèles
L'Enigme Algènubi	1985	Minipuce
L'Enigme d'Algènubi	1985	Exelvision
Les Aigles	1987	Exelvision
L'Intrus + Smurfy	1985	Sprites
Logiformes	1985	Squirelle; Langage et Informatique
Logiphrases	1985	Squirelle
Mario's Cement Factory	198?	Exelement Votre
Meurtre a Grande Vitesse	1985	Cobra Soft
Midway	198?	Exelvision
Mille-Pattes	1985	Exelvision
Monopolic	198?	Free Game Blot
M'yams	1985	Exelvision
Neurone	1985	Editions Parallèles
Nimbus	198?	Micro Scoop
Otho	1984	Initiel
Pindo	1986	Minipuce
Polichinelle		Minipuce
Produits et Surfaces	198?	Cedic-Nathan
Pyrox	1987	Editions Parallèles
Quizzy	1985	Exelvision
Rafale X	1987	Minipuce
Robix	198?	Videomatique
Sphinx	1985	Exelvision
Startrek	198?	Exelement Votre
Superbad	198?	Exelvision
Tennis	198?	Exelvision
Threat Star	1987	Tilt
Tour d'Europe	198?	Exelvision
Une Affaire en Or	198?	Free Game Blot
Vega X4	1986	Minipuce
Virus	198?	Exelvision
Voyage en France	198?	Exelvision
Wizord	1985	Exelvision
World War 3	1984	Free Game Blot
