= List of VIA C7 microprocessors =

The C7 microprocessor from VIA Technologies is a seventh-generation CPU targeted at the consumer and embedded market.

== Desktop processors ==
=== C7 ===
==== "Esther" (90 nm) ====
- All models support: MMX, SSE, SSE2, SSE3, NX bit, VIA PadLock (SHA, AES, Montgomery Multiplier, RNG)
- VIA PowerSaver supported with 2 ACPI P-states

Model number	Frequency	L2-Cache	Front Side Bus	Multiplier	Voltage	TDP	Socket	Release date	Part number(s)
C7 1.0	1000 MHz	128 KiB	400 MT/s	10×	1.004 V	9 W	NanoBGA2	May 27, 2005	
C7 1.3	1300 MHz	128 KiB	400 MT/s	13×	1.004 V	12 W	NanoBGA2	May 27, 2005	
C7 1.5	1500 MHz	128 KiB	400 MT/s	15×	1.004 V	12 W	NanoBGA2	May 27, 2005	
C7 1.6	1600 MHz	128 KiB	400 MT/s	16×	1.084 V	15 W	NanoBGA2	May 27, 2005	
C7 1.8	1800 MHz	128 KiB	800 MT/s	9×	1.148 V	18 W	NanoBGA2	May 27, 2005	
C7 2.0	2000 MHz	128 KiB	800 MT/s	10×	1.148 V	20 W	NanoBGA2	May 27, 2005	

=== C7-D ===
==== "Esther" (90 nm) ====
- All models support: MMX, SSE, SSE2, SSE3, NX bit, VIA PadLock (SHA, AES, Montgomery Multiplier, RNG)
- VIA PowerSaver supported on Model D 1.8 and 2.0 with 2 ACPI P-states

Model number	Frequency	L2-Cache	Front Side Bus	Multiplier	Voltage	TDP	Socket	Release date	Part number(s)
C7-D 1.5	1500 MHz	128 KiB	400 MT/s	15×	1.084 V	25 W	NanoBGA2	September 13, 2006	
C7-D 1.8	1800 MHz	128 KiB	400 MT/s	18×	V	W	NanoBGA2	September 13, 2006	
C7-D 2.0	2000 MHz	128 KiB	800 MT/s	10×	V	W	NanoBGA2		

== Mobile processors ==
=== C7-M ===
==== "Esther" (standard-voltage, 90 nm) ====
- All models support: MMX, SSE, SSE2, SSE3, NX bit, VIA PadLock (SHA, AES, Montgomery Multiplier, RNG)
- VIA PowerSaver supported with up to 8 ACPI P-states

Model number	Clock speed	L2 Cache	FSB speed	Clock multiplier	Voltage range	TDP	Socket	Release date
C7-M 754	1.5 GHz	128 KB	400 MHz	15×	1.004 V	12 W	Socket 479	June 1, 2005
C7-M 764	1.6 GHz	128 KB	400 MHz	16×	1.084 V	15 W	Socket 479	June 1, 2005
C7-M 765	1.6 GHz	128 KB	533 MHz	12×	1.084 V	15 W	Socket 479	June 1, 2005
C7-M 784	1.8 GHz	128 KB	400 MHz	18×	1.148 V	18 W	Socket 479	June 1, 2005
C7-M 785	1.86 GHz	128 KB	533 MHz	14×	1.148 V	18 W	Socket 479	June 1, 2005
C7-M 794	2 GHz	128 KB	400 MHz	20×	1.148 V - 1.196 V	20 W	Socket 479	June 1, 2005
C7-M 795	2 GHz	128 KB	533 MHz	15×	1.148 V - 1.196 V	20 W	Socket 479	June 1, 2005

==== "Esther" (ultra-low-voltage, 90 nm) ====
- All models support: MMX, SSE, SSE2, SSE3, NX bit, VIA PadLock (SHA, AES, Montgomery Multiplier, RNG)
- VIA PowerSaver supported with up to 8 ACPI P-states

Model number	Clock speed	L2 Cache	FSB speed	Clock multiplier	Voltage range	TDP	Socket	Release date	Part number(s)
C7-M 770	1 GHz	128 KB	400 MHz	10×	0.844 V	5 W	Socket 479	March 10, 2006	
C7-M 779	1 GHz	128 KB	400 MHz	10×	0.796 V	3.5 W	Socket 479	?	
C7-M 771	1.2 GHz	128 KB	400 MHz	12×	0.860 V	7 W	Socket 479	March 10, 2006	
C7-M 772	1.2 GHz	128 KB	400 MHz	12x	0.844 V	5 W	Socket 479	?	
C7-M 775	1.5 GHz	128 KB	400 MHz	15×	0.956 V	7.5 W	Socket 479	March 10, 2006	
C7-M ULV	1.6 GHz	128 KB	400 MHz	16x	0.796 - 0.957 V	7.5 W	Socket 479	?	
C7-M ULV	1.6 GHz	128 KB	800 MHz	8×	0.796 - 0.988 V	8 W	Socket 479	September 2007	

== See also ==
- List of VIA microprocessors
