= List of AMD K5 processors =

The AMD K5 microprocessor is a Pentium-class 32-bit CPU manufactured by American company Advanced Micro Devices (AMD), and targeted at the consumer market. It was the first x86 processor designed by AMD from the ground up, and not licensed or reverse-engineered as previous generations of x86 processors produced by AMD.

== Desktop CPU ==
=== K5 (model 0, 500 & 350 nm) ===
- CPU-ID: 5-0-0, 5-0-1: Part numbers which contain "SSA/5" are 500 and part numbers which contain "K5-PR" are 501
- Transistors: 4.3 million
- Die size: 251 mm^{2}(SSA/5), 161 mm^{2}(K5-PR)
- Manufacturing Processes: 500 nm (SSA/5), 350 nm (K5-PR)

Model number	Frequency	FSB	Multiplier	Core Voltage	TDP	Socket	Release date	Part number(s)	Release price (USD)
K5-75	75 MHz	50 MHz	1.5x	3.525 V	11.8 W	Socket 5 Socket 7	March 27, 1996	AMD-K5-PR75ABR; AMD-SSA/5-75ABR	$75
K5-90	90 MHz	60 MHz	1.5x	3.525 V	14.3 W	Socket 5 Socket 7	March 27, 1996	AMD-K5-PR90ABQ; AMD-SSA/5-90ABQ	$99
K5-100	100 MHz	66 MHz	1.5x	3.525 V	15.8 W	Socket 5 Socket 7	June 17, 1996	AMD-K5-PR100ABQ; AMD-K5-PR100ABR	$84

=== K5 (model 1, 350 nm) ===
- CPU-ID: 5-1-1
- Transistors: 4.3 million
- Die size: 181 mm^{2}
- This is the first K5 processor family that internally ran at slower speed than its rated speed.

Model number	Frequency	FSB	Multiplier	Core Voltage	TDP	Socket	Release date	Part number(s)	Release price (USD)
K5-120	90 MHz (rated 120)	60 MHz	1.5x	3.525 V	12.6 W	Socket 5 Socket 7	October 7, 1996	AMD-K5-PR120ABQ; AMD-K5-PR120ABR	$106
K5-133	100 MHz (rated 133)	66 MHz	1.5x	3.525 V	14 W	Socket 5 Socket 7	October 7, 1996	AMD-K5-PR133ABR; AMD-K5-PR133ABQ	$134

=== K5 (model 2, 350 nm) ===
- CPU-ID: 5-2-4
- Transistors: 4.3 million
- Die size: 181 mm^{2}

Model number	Frequency	FSB	Multiplier	Core Voltage	TDP	Socket	Release date	Part number(s)	Release price (USD)
K5-150	105 MHz (rated 150)	60 MHz	1.75x	3.525 V	? W	Socket 5 Socket 7	January, 1997	AMD-K5-PR150ABR	$106
K5-166	116.7 MHz (rated 166)	66 MHz	1.75x	3.525 V	16.4 W	Socket 5 Socket 7	January 13, 1997	AMD-K5-PR166ABQ; AMD-K5-PR166ABR; AMD-K5-PR166ABX	$167

=== K5 (model 3, 350 nm) ===
- CPU-ID: 5-3-4
- Transistors: 4.3 million
- Die size: 181 mm^{2}

Model number	Frequency	FSB	Multiplier	Core Voltage	TDP	Socket	Release date	Part number(s)	Release price (USD)
K5-200	133 MHz (rated 200)	66 MHz	2x	3.525 V	? W	Socket 5 Socket 7	1997	AMD-K5-PR200ABX	

== See also ==
- AMD K5
- List of AMD microprocessors
- List of AMD Duron microprocessors
- List of AMD Athlon XP microprocessors
- List of AMD Athlon 64 microprocessors
- List of AMD Athlon X2 microprocessors
- List of AMD Phenom microprocessors
- List of AMD Opteron microprocessors
- List of AMD Sempron microprocessors
