= PA-7100 =

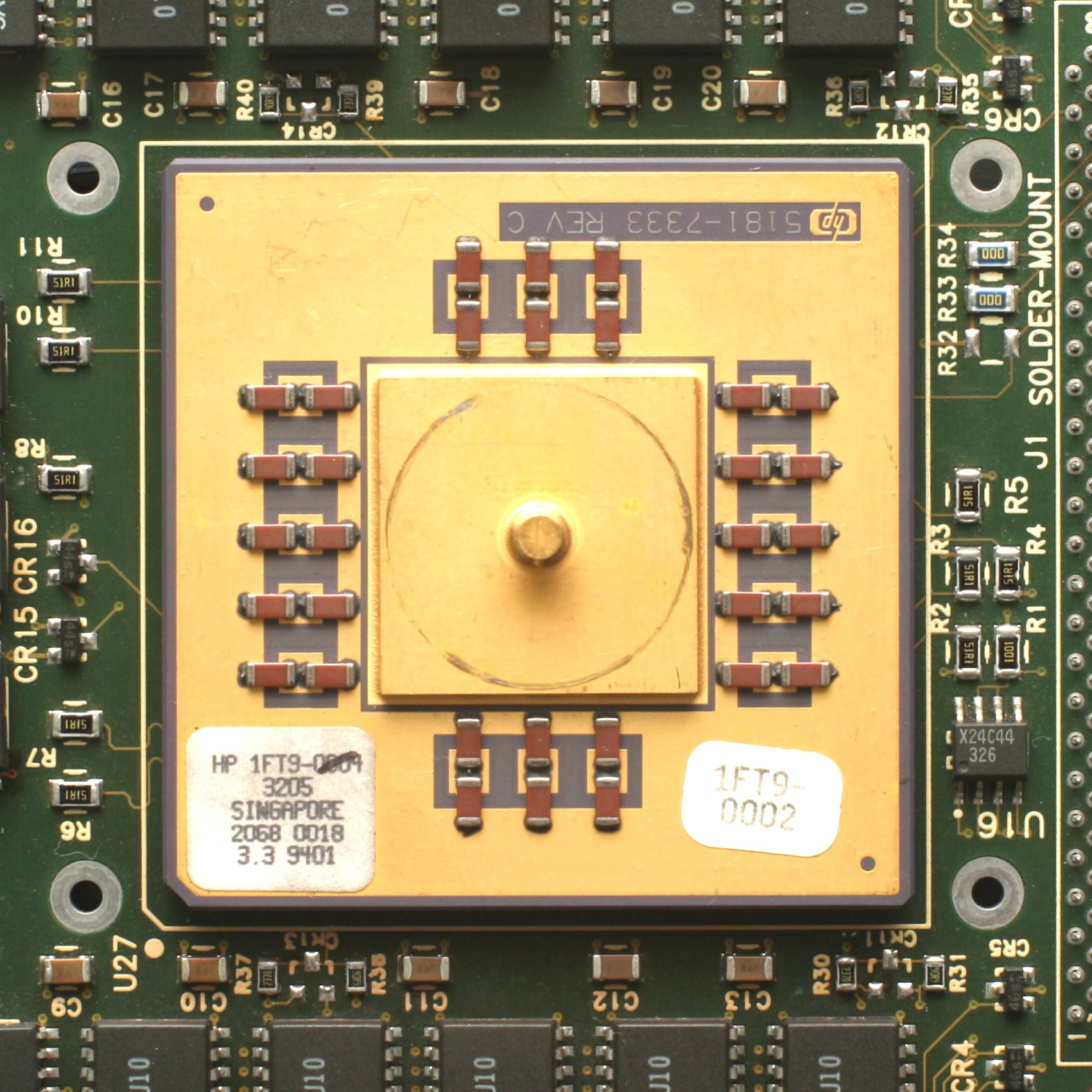
A PA-7150 microprocessor

The PA-7100 is a microprocessor developed by Hewlett-Packard (HP) that implemented the PA-RISC 1.1 instruction set architecture (ISA). It is also known as the PCX-T and by its code name Thunderbird. It was introduced in early 1992 and was the first PA-RISC microprocessor to integrate the floating-point unit (FPU) on-die. It operated at 33 – 100 MHz and competed primarily with the Digital Equipment Corporation (DEC) Alpha 21064 in the workstation and server markets. PA-7100 users were HP in its HP 9000 workstations and Stratus Computer in its Continuum fault-tolerant servers. Samsung also introduced workstations running HP-UX based on the PA-7100 and system technology licensed from HP.

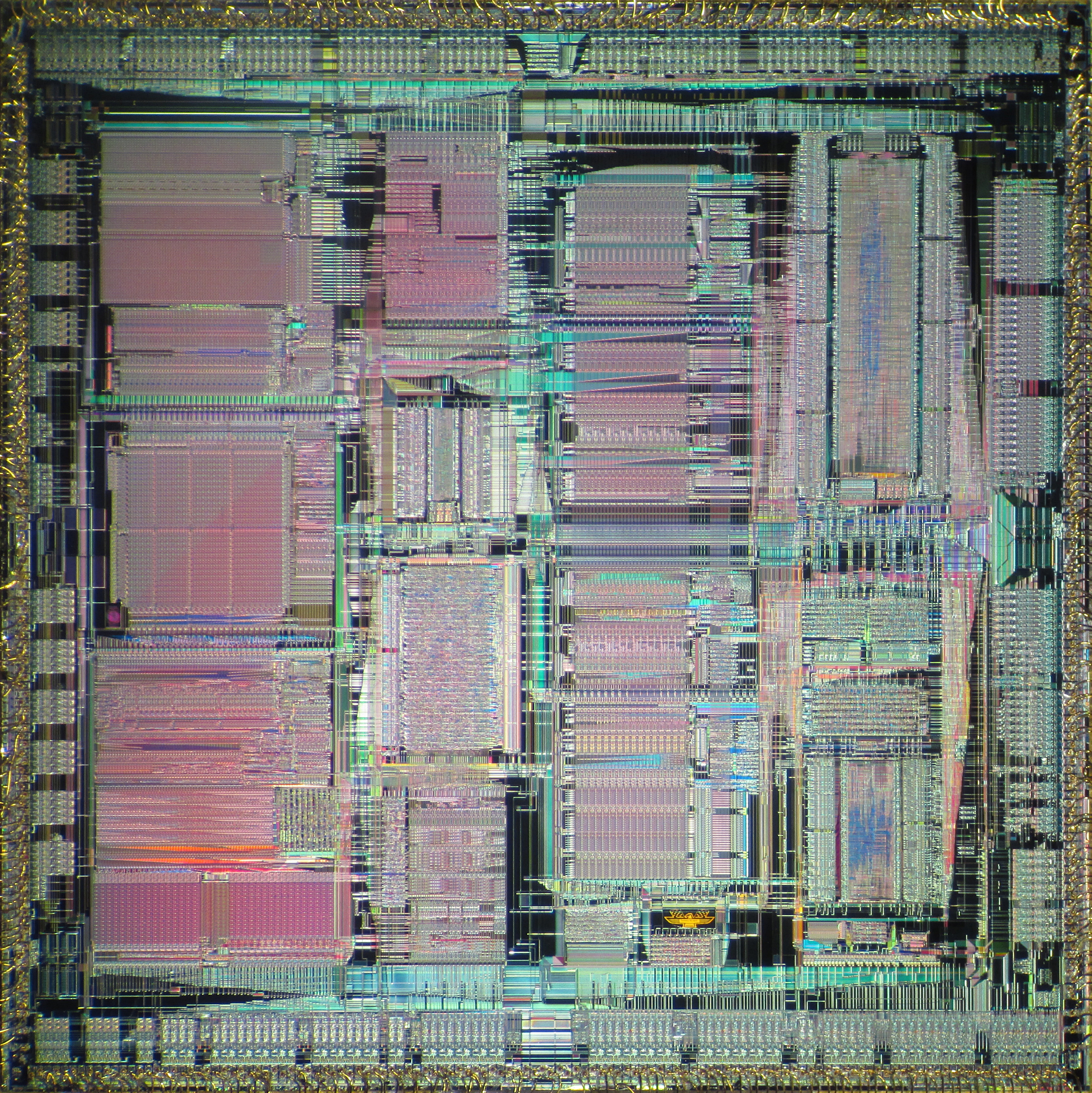
Die shot of PA-7150

It was based on the PA-7000 (PCX-S) chip set, a previous PA-RISC implementation consisting of a microprocessor and FPU. The PA-7100 contains 850 000 transistors and measures 14.3 x 14.3 mm for an area of 204.49 mm². It was fabricated by HP in their CMOS26B process, a 0.8 μm complementary metal–oxide–semiconductor (CMOS) process. The PA-7100 is packaged in a 504-pin ceramic pin grid array that has a copper-tungsten heat spreader.

An improved PA-7100, the PA-7150 was introduced in 1994. It operated at 125 MHz, due to improved circuit design. It was fabricated in the same CMOS26B process as the PA-7100.

Both microprocessors were fabricated at HP's Corvallis, Oregon and Fort Collins, Colorado fabrication plants.

The PA-7100LC and PA-7200 microprocessors were also based on the PA-7100.
