= Stratus Technologies =

American computer manufacturer

Stratus Technologies, Inc.
- Type: Private
- Industry: Information Technology
- Founded: 1980; 46 years ago
- Fate: merged into SMART Global Holdings (SGH) and renamed Penguin Solutions, Inc.
- Products: fault tolerant computer hardware and software
- Owner: Penguin Solutions, Inc.
- Parent: Penguin Solutions, Inc.
- Website: Stratus.com

Stratus Technologies, Inc. is a major producer of fault tolerant computer servers and software. The company was founded in 1980 as Stratus Computer, Inc. in Natick, Massachusetts, and adopted its present name in 1999. The current CEO and president is Dave Laurello. The founder of Stratus was Bill Foster, who was CEO until Stratus was acquired by Ascend Communications in 1999. Prior to 2022, Stratus Technologies, Inc. was a privately held company, owned solely by Siris Capital Group. The parent company, Stratus Technologies Bermuda Holdings, Ltd., was incorporated in Bermuda. In 2022, the company was acquired by Smart Global Holdings (SGH) and currently operates within SGH's Intelligent Platform Solutions (IPS) business. In October 2024 SGH completed its rebranding and name change to Penguin Solutions

Stratus Computer was a Marlborough, Massachusetts, based producer of fault-tolerant minicomputers. It competed with computers from Tandem Computers and to a lesser extent Digital Equipment Corporation's VAX.

Starting in 1983, its computers were resold worldwide by Stratus' own sales force as well as partners such as Olivetti under the CPS/32 ("Continuous Processing System") brand. Then, from 1985 to 1993, its computers were resold by IBM under the IBM System/88 brand. The company is now based in Maynard, Massachusetts.

== History ==
Stratus shipped its first computer in February 1982, 21 months after its founding. The customer was the West Lynn Creamery, located in nearby Lynn, Massachusetts.

The company was founded in 1980 by Bill Foster, Bob Freiburghouse, and Gardner Hendrie. In 1974, Bill briefly worked with the founders of the first fault tolerant company, Tandem Computers. That experience motivated him to start Stratus, and use new 32-bit microprocessor technology to compete against them. Bill knew Freiburghouse and Hendrie from his work experience at Data General. They raised $1.7 million venture capital dollars in May 1980. Twenty-three engineers, mostly from the MIT Multics project and Data General, produced their initial product in just twenty-one months, and delivered it to a local company, the West Lynn Creamery. The owners of West Lynn insisted that they be allowed to purchase stock in Stratus, indicating their confidence in the company. Stratus went public in 1983.

The company's traditional markets have been financial services companies such as banks and credit card companies. Beginning in the 1990s, the company moved into the telecommunications industry, particularly in the area of network management and custom services. In time, its telecommunications revenues surpassed those from enterprise computing. This led to a buyout of the company by Ascend Communications in 1998 (later acquired by Lucent Technologies).

The enterprise server portion of the business was of little interest to Ascend and that portion was spun off in a management buyout in 1999, with funding from international investment firm, Investcorp. The company was named Stratus Technologies, Inc.

In the second quarter of 2002, Lucent sold the telecom product lines that originally came from Stratus to Platinum Equity, a buyout firm based in Los Angeles. That unit was eventually named Cemprus LLC. Stratus purchased Cemprus in 2003. It is now a wholly owned subsidiary of Stratus. This acquisition gave Stratus the SS7 signaling software for phone networks and intelligent gateway software, so that traditional and IP voice equipment could communicate. This software can be used to support higher-level telephony applications, such as calling-card and toll-free phone number services.

In 2006, Stratus purchased Emergent Network Solutions of Allen, Texas. Stratus sold Emergent in 2009, and Emergent became known as Stratus Telecommunications. The two companies became separate entities (i.e., one is not the parent of the other). On July 16, 2010, as a reverse merger between YMax and VocalTec - all of the Stratus Telecommunications technologies are owned by VocalTec.

In 2012, Stratus acquired the assets, products, services, and intellectual property, of Marathon Technologies along with its customer base and channel-partner network.

Stratus Technologies, Inc. was acquired by Siris Capital Group on April 28, 2014. On June 29, 2022, Smart Global Holdings announced the acquisition of Stratus from Siris for US$225 million. On April 23, 2025, Stratus rebranded as "Penguin Solutions, Inc". The stratus.com website redirects to https://www.penguinsolutions.com/.

== Products and customers ==
Its legacy product line was originally based on Motorola MC68000 processors (FT and XA series), and then migrated to Intel i860 processors (XA/R series), then to Hewlett-Packard's PA-RISC processors (Continuum series), and finally to Intel Xeon processors (V Series). That line runs the VOS operating system, which originally had many features inspired by or derived from Multics. Other operating systems supported on the legacy platforms (XA/R, Jetta / Continuum)—HP-UX and a home-grown UNIX product called FTX (Fault-Tolerant UNIX)—are supported but no longer actively sold.

In June 2002, Stratus introduced the ftServer line of Intel-based servers, running Microsoft Windows 2000 and higher. The Stratus ftServer line sold today supports Windows Server, VMware vSphere, and Red Hat Enterprise Linux. The company sells models of ftServer designated as entry-level, mid-range and enterprise-class fault tolerant servers.

The company began offering Stratus Avance software in June 2008, a high availability product with virtualization built in. Avance runs on two general-purpose x86 servers and allows deployment of applications across high-availability virtual machines, freeing up existing x86 servers. The two servers comprising the Avance high-availability platform may be separated by up to three miles for purposes of disaster recovery and business continuity. Avance is intended to serve small-to-medium size businesses' need for affordable and simple high availability and virtualization.

Stratus has a large presence in Maynard, Massachusetts, its U.S. headquarters, and in Phoenix, Arizona, as well as several worldwide offices, in locations such as the UK, the Netherlands, South Africa, France, Germany, Italy, Spain, Australia, New Zealand, Singapore, Hong Kong, China, Japan and India.

The company has a vast customer base, but popular types of its customers include banks and credit unions, emergency response centers (such as 911 in the USA), police departments, fire departments, hospitals, clinics, governments, credit card companies, stock exchanges, telcos/phone companies and Internet providers.
