= PA-RISC =

Instruction set architecture by Hewlett-Packard

PA-RISC (HP/PA)
- Designer: Hewlett-Packard
- Bits: 64-bit (32→64)
- Introduced: 1986 (1996 PA-RISC 2.0)
- Version: 2.0 (1996)
- Design: RISC
- Encoding: Fixed
- Branching: Compare and branch
- Endianness: Big (PA-RISC 1.0); Big/optional bi (PA-RISC 1.1 and 2.0)
- Extensions: Multimedia Acceleration eXtensions (MAX), MAX-2
- Open: No
- Successor: PA-WideWord → Itanium

Registers
- General-purpose: 32
- Floating-point: 32 64-bit (16 64-bit in PA-RISC 1.0)

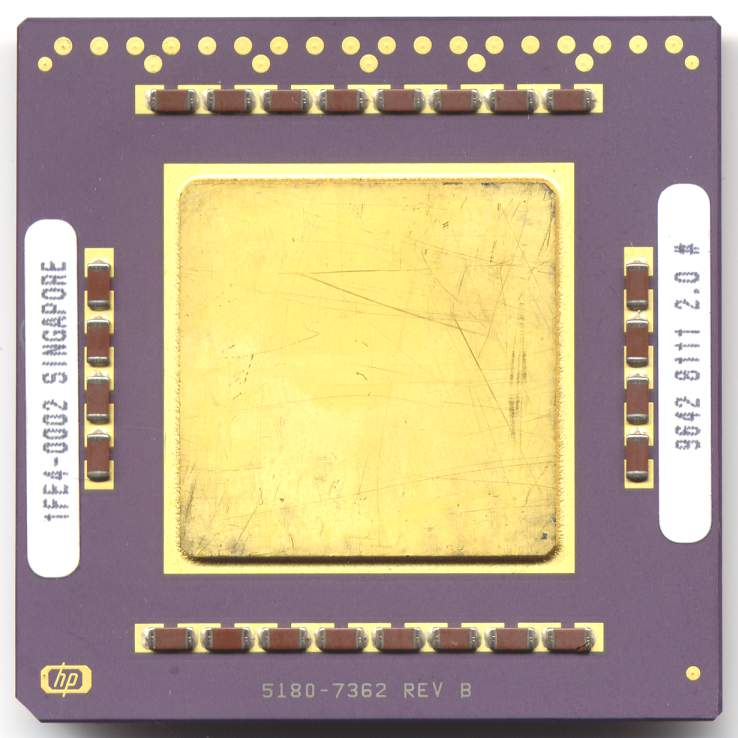
HP PA-RISC 7300LC microprocessor

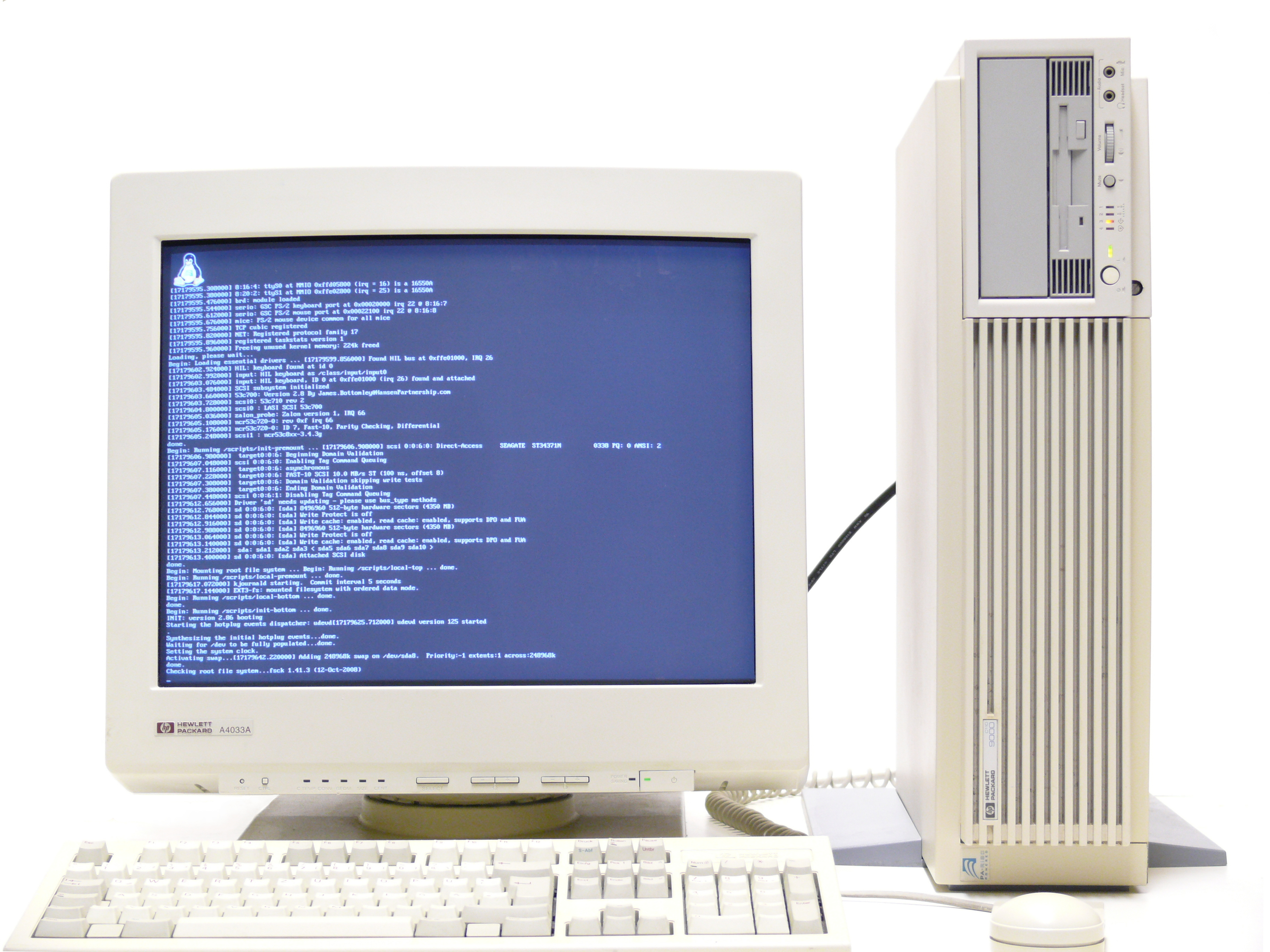
HP 9000 C110 PA-RISC workstation booting Debian Linux

Precision Architecture RISC (PA-RISC) or Hewlett Packard Precision Architecture (HP/PA or HPPA), is a general purpose computer instruction set architecture (ISA) developed by Hewlett-Packard from the 1980s until the 2000s.

The architecture was introduced on 26 February 1986, when the HP 3000 Series 930 and HP 9000 Model 840 computers were launched featuring the first implementation, the TS1. HP stopped selling PA-RISC-based HP 9000 systems at the end of 2008 but supported servers running PA-RISC chips until 2013. PA-RISC was succeeded by the Itanium (originally IA-64) ISA, jointly developed by HP and Intel.

== History ==
In the late 1980s, HP was building four series of computers, all based on CISC CPUs. One line was the IBM PC compatible Intel i286-based HP Vectra series, started in 1986. All others were non-Intel systems. One of them was the HP 9000 Series 300 of Motorola 68000 series based workstations, another HP 9000 Series 200 line of technical workstations based on a custom silicon on sapphire (SOS) chip design, the SOS based 16-bit HP 3000 classic series, and finally the HP 9000 Series 500 minicomputers, based on their own (16- and 32-bit) FOCUS microprocessor.

The Precision Architecture is the result of what was known inside Hewlett-Packard as the Spectrum program. HP planned to use Spectrum to move all of their non-PC compatible machines to a single RISC CPU family.

In early 1982, work on the Precision Architecture began at HP Laboratories, defining the instruction set and virtual memory system. Development of the first TTL implementation started in April 1983. With simulation of the processor having completed in 1983, a final processor design was delivered to software developers in July 1984. Systems prototyping followed, with "lab prototypes" being produced in 1985 and product prototypes in 1986.

The first processors were introduced in products during 1986, with the first HP 9000 Series 840 units shipping in November of that year. They were also used in a new series of HP 3000 machines in the late 1980s: the 930 and 950, commonly known at the time as Spectrum systems, the name given to them in the development labs. These machines ran MPE-XL, whereas HP 9000 machines employing the PA-RISC processor ran the HP-UX version of Unix. The first implementation of the Precision Architecture was the TS1, a central processing unit built from discrete transistor–transistor logic (74F TTL) devices. Later implementations were multi-chip VLSI designs fabricated in NMOS processes (NS1 and NS2) and CMOS (CS1 and PCX), beginning with the HP 3000 Series 950, HP 9000 Model 850S and HP 9000 Model 825, introduced in late 1987.

The HP Precision Architecture has thirty-two 32-bit integer registers, sixteen 64-bit floating-point registers, and has a single branch delay slot. This means that the instruction immediately following a branch instruction is executed before the program's control flow is transferred to the target instruction of the branch. An HP Precision processor also includes a Processor Status Word (PSW) register. The PSW register contains various flags that enable virtual addressing, protection, interruptions, and other status information. The number of floating-point registers was doubled in the 1.1 version to 32 once it became apparent that 16 were inadequate and restricted performance. The architects included Allen Baum, Hans Jeans, Michael J. Mahon, Ruby Bei-Loh Lee, Russel Kao, Steve Muchnick, Terrence C. Miller, David Fotland, and William S. Worley.

Other operating systems ported to the PA-RISC architecture include Linux, OpenBSD, NetBSD, OSF/1, NeXTSTEP, and ChorusOS.

An interesting aspect of the PA-RISC line is that most of its generations have no level 2 cache. Instead large level 1 caches are used, initially as separate chips connected by a bus, and later integrated on-chip. Only the PA-7100LC and PA-7300LC have L2 caches. Another innovation of the PA-RISC is the addition of vector instructions (SIMD) in the form of MAX, which were first introduced on the PA-7100LC.

Precision RISC Organization, an industry group led by HP, was founded in 1992, to promote the PA-RISC architecture. Members included Convex, Hitachi, Hughes Aircraft, Mitsubishi, NEC, OKI, Prime, Stratus, Yokogawa, Red Brick Software, and Allegro Consultants, Inc.

The ISA was extended in 1996 to 64 bits, with this revision named PA-RISC 2.0. PA-RISC 2.0 also added fused multiply–add instructions, which help certain floating-point intensive algorithms, and the MAX-2 SIMD extension, which provides instructions for accelerating multimedia applications. The first PA-RISC 2.0 implementation was the PA-8000, which was introduced in January 1996.

== CPU specifications ==
Image	Model	Marketing name	Year	Frequency [MHz]	Memory Bus [MB/s]	Process [μm]	Transistors [millions]	Die size [mm^{2}]	Power [W]	Dcache [KB]	Icache [KB]	L2 cache [MB]	ISA	Notes
	TS-1	?	1986	8	?	?	—	—	?	64	64	—	1.0	
	CS-1	?	1987	8	?	1.6	0.164	72.93	1	—	0.25	—	1.0	
	NS-1	?	1987	25/30	?	1.7	0.144	70.56	?	16-128	16-128	—	1.0	Unified L1 cache
	NS-2	?	1989	25/30	?	1.5	0.183	196	27	512	512	—	1.0	
	PCX	?	1990	50/60	?	1.0	0.196	?	?	?	?	?	1.0	
	PCX-S	PA-7000	1991	66	?	1.0	0.58	201.6	?	256	256	—	1.1a	
	PCX-T	PA-7100	1992	33–100	?	0.8	0.85	196	?	2048	1024	—	1.1b	
	PCX-T	PA-7150	1994	125	?	0.8	0.85	196	?	2048	1024	—	1.1b	
	PCX-T'	PA-7200	1994	120	960	0.55	1.26	210	30	1024	2048	—	1.1c	
	PCX-L	PA-7100LC	1994	60–100	?	0.75	0.9	201.6	7–11	—	1	2	1.1d	
	PCX-L2	PA-7300LC	1996	132–180	?	0.5	9.2	260.1	?	64	64	0–8	1.1e	
	PCX-U	PA-8000	1996	160–180	960	0.5	3.8	337.68	?	1024	1024	—	2.0	
	PCX-U+	PA-8200	1997	200–240	960	0.5	3.8	337.68	?	2048	2048	—	2.0	
	PCX-W	PA-8500	1998	300–440	1920	0.25	140	467	?	1024	512	—	2.0	
	PCX-W+	PA-8600	2000	360–550	1920	0.25	140	467	?	1024	512	—	2.0	
	PCX-W2	PA-8700(+)	2001	625–875	1920	0.18	186	304	<7.1@1.5 V	1536	768	—	2.0	
	Mako	PA-8800	2003	800–1000	6400	0.13	300	361	?	768/core	768/core	0 or 32	2.0	
	Shortfin	PA-8900	2005	800–1100	6400	0.13	?	?	?	768/core	768/core	0 or 64	2.0	

== See also ==
- Amiga Hombre chipset – A PA-7150-based chipset with a complete multimedia system for Commodore Amiga
- Other third-party PA-RISC chips were built by Hitachi, Oki, and Winbond.
- ARM architecture family — Competing mid 1980s RISC ISA
- SPARC — Competing mid 1980s RISC ISA
