= TI-34 =

Scientific calculator

The TI-34 name is a branding used by Texas Instruments for its mid-range scientific calculators aimed at the educational market. The first TI-34 model was introduced in 1987 as a midpoint between the TI-30 series and the TI-35/TI-36 series. Earlier models included Boolean algebra features, though these were removed with the introduction of the TI-34II in 1999, which focuses more on fractional calculations and other subjects common in middle and high school math and science curricula.

The TI-34 Calculator/Classroom Kit formed the basis for teaching materials to familiarise students with the functions of the calculator.

== TI-34 (1987) ==
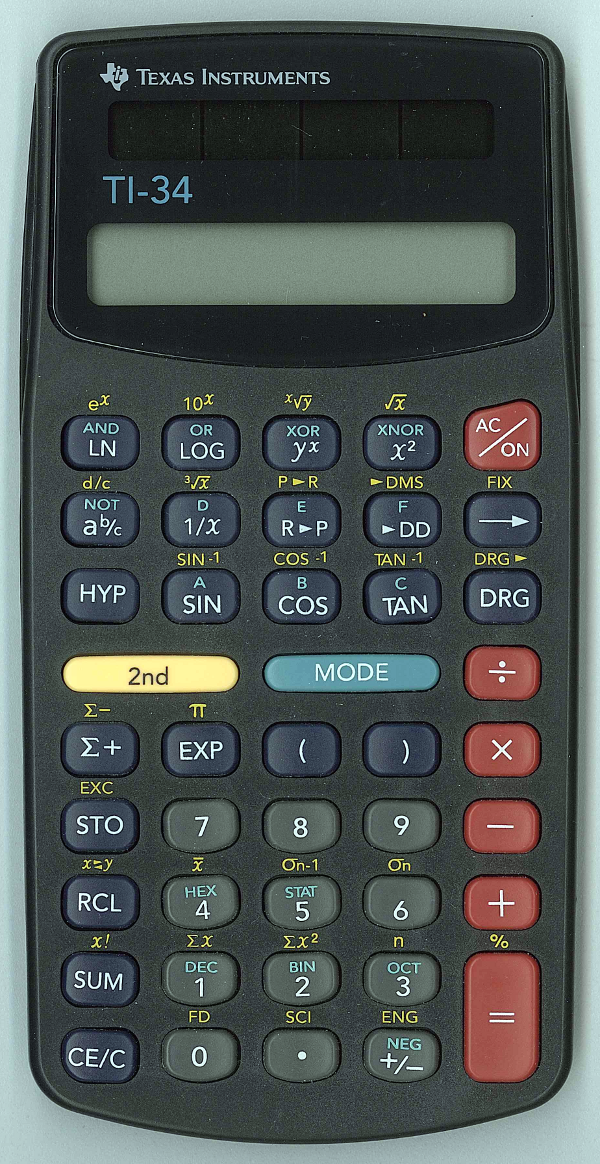
TI-34 calculator, manufactured in China around 1997

The feature sets were similar to TI-36 SOLAR introduced in 1986, but without complex number support, normal distribution stat functions (P(), Q(), R()), permutations, combinations, factorials, user-accessible operand registers. However, it added fraction mode display and conversion (pure/mixed), Boolean logic operations (NOT, AND, OR, XOR, XNOR) over contemporary TI-35 PLUS/36 SOLAR.

It uses the Toshiba T7988 processor.

The key and case design was based on contemporary TI-30 SLR, TI-31, TI-32, rather than TI-35/36.

It was manufactured by Inventec Corporation in Taiwan.

=== 1989 ===
It was identical to the 1987 model in functionality, except the red keys are now in blue.

=== 1991 ===
It uses a smaller solar cell than its predecessor. Key colours were changed slightly.

It was manufactured in Malaysia.

=== 1994 ===
The motherboard was smaller compared to the predecessors.

Cosmetic changes include reverting to the key colour scheme used in the 1987 model.

It was manufactured in Italy.

=== 1996 (Malaysia) ===
It was manufactured in Malaysia.

=== 1996 (China) ===
Cosmetic changes include rounder case and keys.

It was manufactured in China.

=== The Educator Advanced (1992) ===
It is a version sold by Stokes Publishing Company, Inc. It is designed for overhead projector use.

It was manufactured in China.

==== 1997 ====
Changes are cosmetic, which uses round keys and different key colours.

=== ORION TI-34 (1999) ===
It is a version sold by Orbit Research, designed for people with disabilities. It includes speech features. Power source comes from 9V battery instead of solar panel.

== TI-34 II Explorer Plus (1999) ==
It was based on the SR16 design from Kinpo Electronics.

Power sources come from smaller solar cells than the 1994 TI-34, and CR2025 battery.

Feature set was based on TI-36X II, but without unit conversions and constants, base calculations, Boolean algebra, complex value functions (abs now only works in real numbers), integral calculation, engineering notation display modes, gradian angle mode, percentage sign, three 2-variable statistic modes (logarithmic, exponent, power), hyperbolic trigonometry.

Functions added over TI-36X II (primarily coming from the TI-32 Math Explorer Plus) include rounding by digits, min/max, lcm/gcd, cube/cubic root, remainder, integer division, percentage conversion, unsimplified fraction, adjustable fraction simplification factor.

=== 2004 ===
It was a cosmetic redesign of the 1999 model. Changes include new coloured keys and screen frame.

It was manufactured in China.

=== TI-40 Collège II (1999) ===
It is a version for Belgium, France and Italy markets.

New features over TI-34 II include supports the French fractions.

Interface changes include removal of UNIT key.

Power source does not include solar panel.

==== 2004 ====
It was a cosmetic redesign of the 1999 model. Changes include new coloured keys and screen frame.

It was manufactured by Nam Tai Electronics, Inc. in China for European market.

=== TI-Collège (2005) ===
It was based on 2004 version of TI-40 Collège II, but added the ability to use percentage sign (from TI-36X II), engineering notation mode (from TI-36X II), scientific notation conversion.

Interface change include the use of French labels on keys and screen. The keys are rearranged so that trigonometrical functions sin, cos and tan are accessible without using menu.

It was manufactured by Nam Tai Electronics, Inc. in China for European market.

== TI-34 MultiView (2008) ==
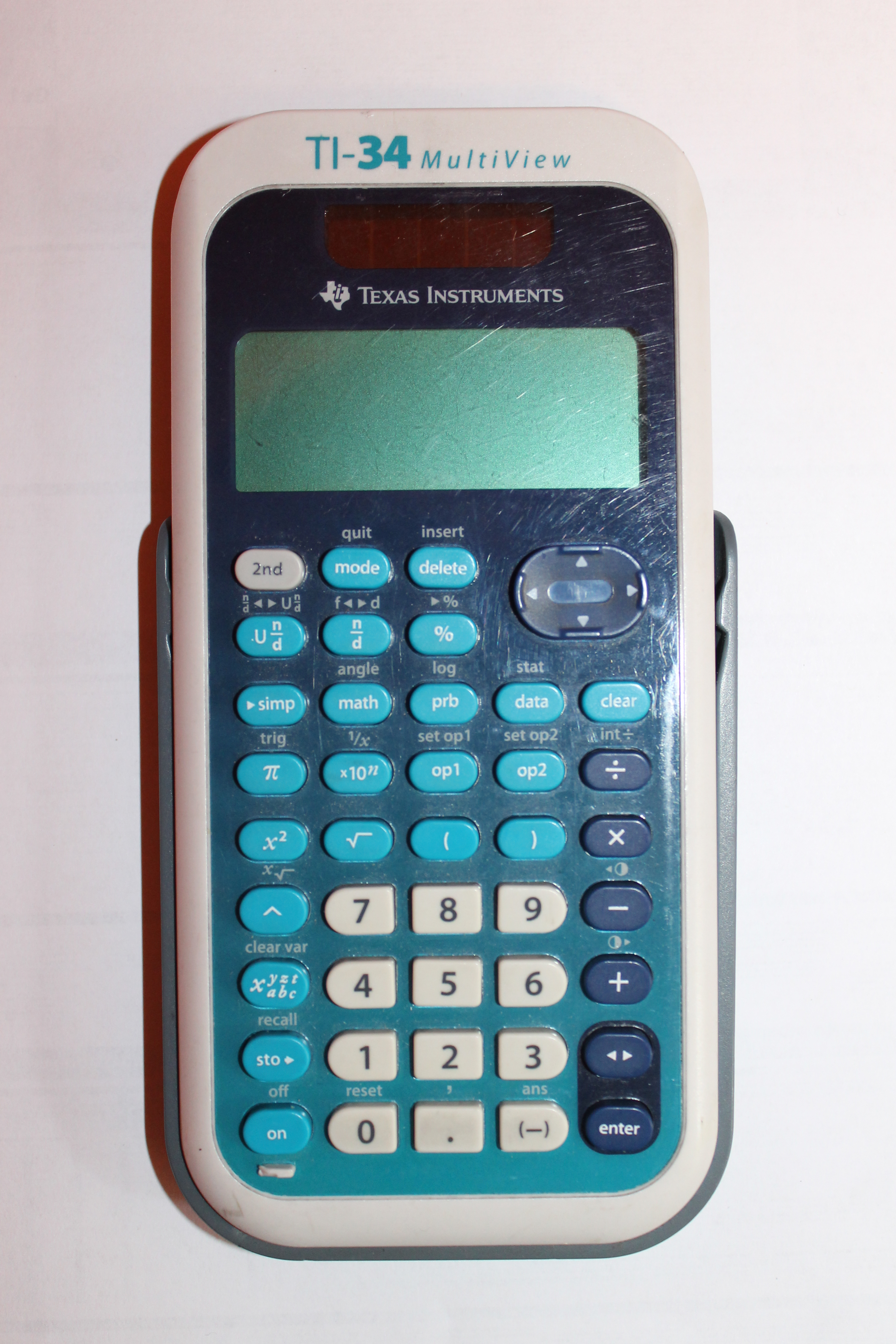
TI-34 MultiView calculator, manufactured in China around 2008.

The MultiView series was originally announced with the release of TI-30XS MultiView in 2007. However, design problems caused release delay of the product line to February 2008.

It features 96×31 pixel screen, which can fit 4 text lines on screen (5 for menus).

MathPrint feature displays mathematical formulae in textbook format.

Data editor allow storing up to 3 lists with 42 items per list. The list values are used in statistic modes as sample points.

Memory registers were increased to 7. For statistic or constant entry, an expression has a maximum of 47 characters.

New mathematical functions over TI-34X II include percentage sign, list conversions.

It was manufactured by Nam Tai Electronics, Inc. in China.

=== TI-Collège Plus (2008) ===
Following design changes in TI-Collège, the key labels are in French.

New features over TI-34 MultiView include Gradian angle mode, Engineering notation mode, scientific notation conversion, median, 25/75-percentile, algebraic factorization, 2x2 linear equation solver, factor decomposition, list generation by function.

Features removed from TI-34 MultiView include mixed fraction mode, polar-cartesian conversion pair function, cube/cubic root, ipart().

It was manufactured by Nam Tai Electronics, Inc. in China for European market.

==== TI-SmartView Collège Plus ====
It is an emulator for TI-Collège Plus, designed for Windows 2000 and Mac OS X 10.4.

=== The Educator TI-34 MultiView (2008) ===
It is a version of TI-34 MultiView sold by Stokes Publishing Company, Inc., designed for overhead projector use.

It was manufactured in China.
