= TI-36 =

Series of scientific calculators by Texas Instruments

Texas Instruments TI-36 is a series of scientific calculators distributed by Texas Instruments. It currently represents the high-end model for the TI-30 product lines.

The TI-36 model designation began in 1986 as variant of TI-35 PLUS with solar cells.

== TI-35 Plus/TI-36 Solar (1986) ==
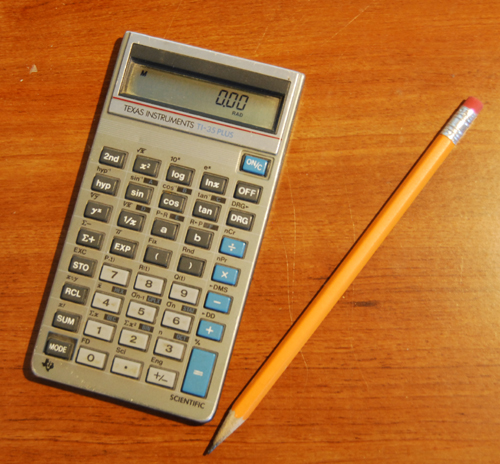
1986 edition of TI-35 PLUS

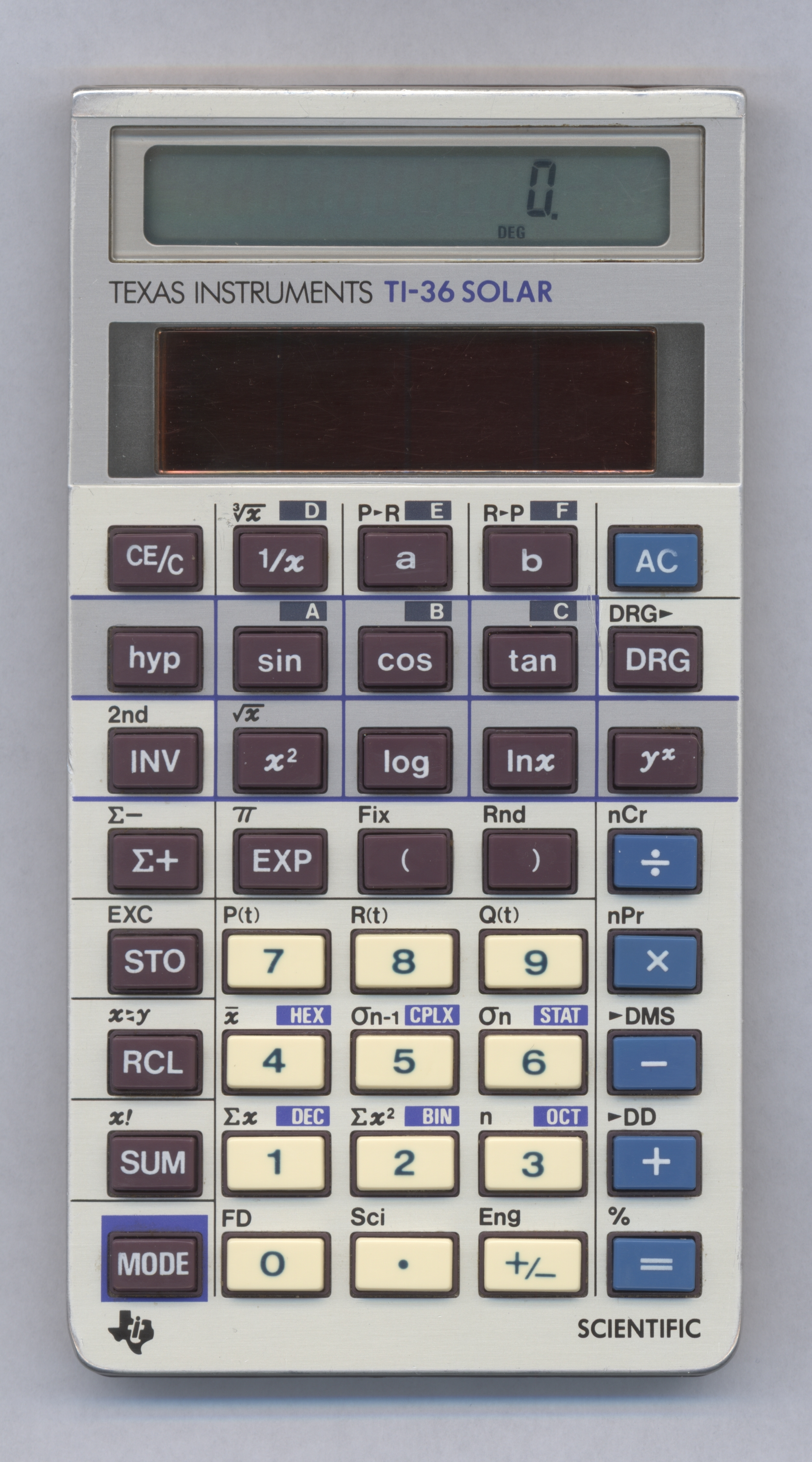
TI-36 SOLAR, first edition

It can display 10 digits of the mantissa with a two-digit exponent, and calculates with 12-digit precision internally.

TI-36 SOLAR was based on 1985 version of TI-35 PLUS, but incorporates solar cells.

It addition to standard features such as trigonometric functions, exponents, logarithm, and intelligent order of operations found in TI-30 and TI-34 series of calculators, it also include base (decimal, hexadecimal, octal, binary) calculations, complex values, statistics. Conversions include polar-rectangular coordinates (P←→R), angles.

Other features include x-y exchange, percentage, register-current stack exchange, factorial, permutation/combination.

Maximum open parenthesis level is 15, with six pending operation stacks.

There are two operand registers (a, b) and one memory register.

TI-35 PLUS uses Toshiba T7767 processor, while TI-36 SOLAR uses Toshiba T7768 processor.

It was manufactured by Taiwanese company Inventec Corporation.

=== 1989 ===
TI-35 PLUS now uses Toshiba T7767S. Cosmetic changes include black shell.

TI-36 SOLAR features smaller, more efficient solar cells, and cosmetic changes. The text "ANYLITE SOLAR" replaces "SCIENTIFIC" on the bottom right of the face.

== TI-35X/36X SOLAR (1991) ==
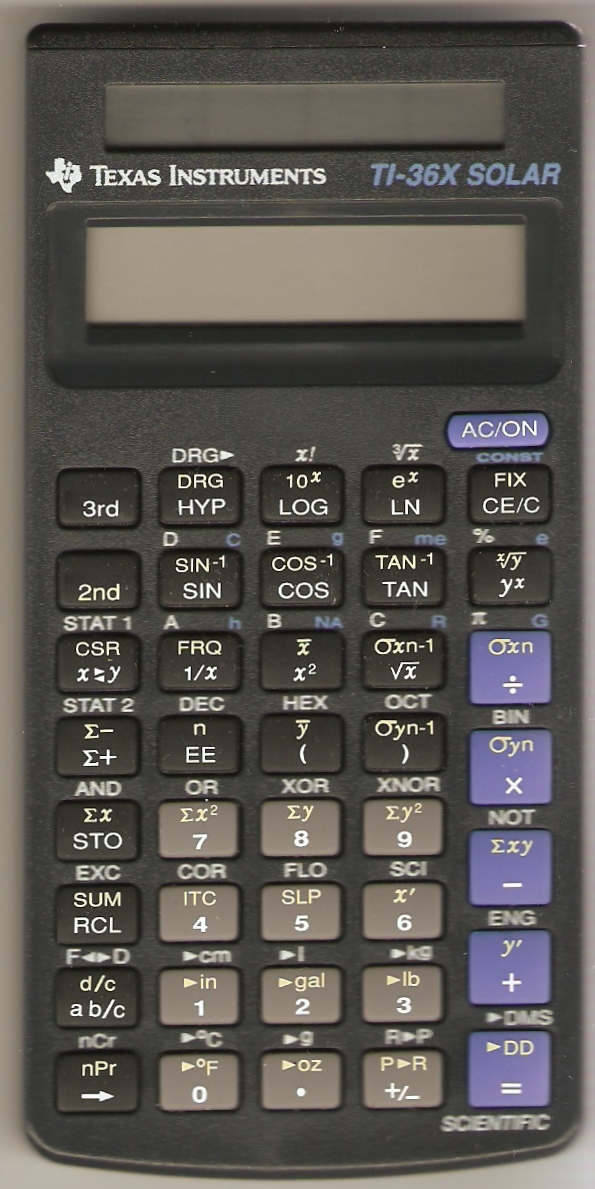
TI-36X Solar, 1993 Revision

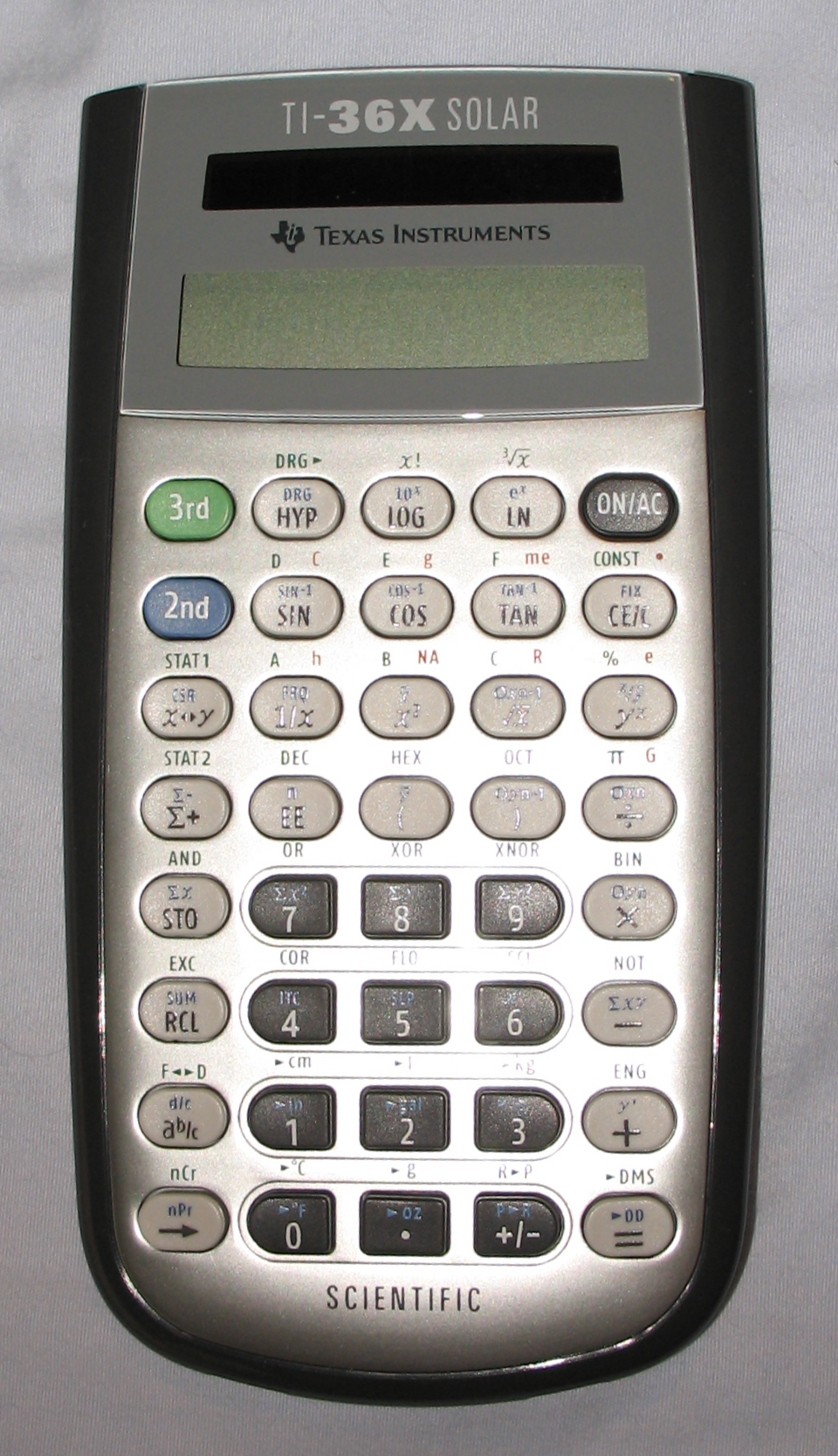
TI-36X Solar, 2004 Revision

The design was similar on the 1991 version of TI-68, but without programming features and tilt screen, and only uses seven-segment LCD. The double shift keys remained.

Base calculations were updated to include logic operations (NOT, AND, OR, XOR, XNOR). Additional unit conversions include cm-in, litre-US gallon, kg-lb, Celsius-Fahrenheit, gram-ounce. There are eight physical constants. The number of registers was increased to three. New statistic modes include two-variable statistics with linear regression.

Other new features include cubic root, fraction mode display and conversion (pure/mixed). Complex functions were removed.

The stack allowed 15 levels of open parentheses.

The TI-35X uses Toshiba T6A58S, and TI-36X SOLAR uses Toshiba T6A57 processor.

=== 1993 ===
It received cosmetic redesigns, which include rubber-like keys and rounder case.

=== TI-36X Solar (1996) ===
It received cosmetic redesigns, which include recolored keys and labels, rounder case, solid plastic button. The bare processor is now attached directly on motherboard. The TI-35 was since then discontinued.

=== TI-36 eco RS (1999) ===
The design is based on 1996 version of TI-36X Solar, but was marketed to use recycled plastics for housing.

=== TI-36X SOLAR (2004) ===
It was a cosmetic redesign for 1996 model, with design theme found in 2004 BA II PLUS Professional financial calculator and 2003 TI-1706SV arithmetic calculator.

== TI-36X II (1999) (2-Line Displays) ==
A prominent new feature is 2-line display, which includes a row of 11-character, 5x7-cell characters, used to display expressions entered by user. To complement the 2-line display, it also stores multiple expressions. The interface was streamlined to use shift menus to access most scientific functions. An expression can have up to 88 characters or items.

Internal precision was increased to 13 digits, while registers were increased to 5 for memory and 2 for expressions (up to 47 characters or items).

New arithmetic features include integer division.

New unit conversions (meter-foot, meter-yard, kilometer-mile, liter-UK gallon, kilometer per hour-meter per second), and 8 more physical constants were added (total 16 constants, 10 conversion pairs). Pi constant was also added.

New 2-variable statistic regression models include natural logarithm, exponent, power. Up to 42 sample points or pairs can be stored.

In base calculation, binary base was removed.

Complex function was restored. Supported functions include conjugate, real/imaginary component, absolute value.

Other new functions include integral calculation (Simpson's Rule, max 99 intervals), random number generators (0-1 real, integer).

Stacks were increased to 23 pending operations, 8 pending values.

Cosmetic changes include a D-pad and a restyled case.

=== 2004 ===
It was a cosmetic redesign of the 1999 model. Changes include new coloured keys and screen frame.

It was manufactured by Nam Tai Electronics.

== TI-36X Pro (2011) (Multi-Line Displays) ==
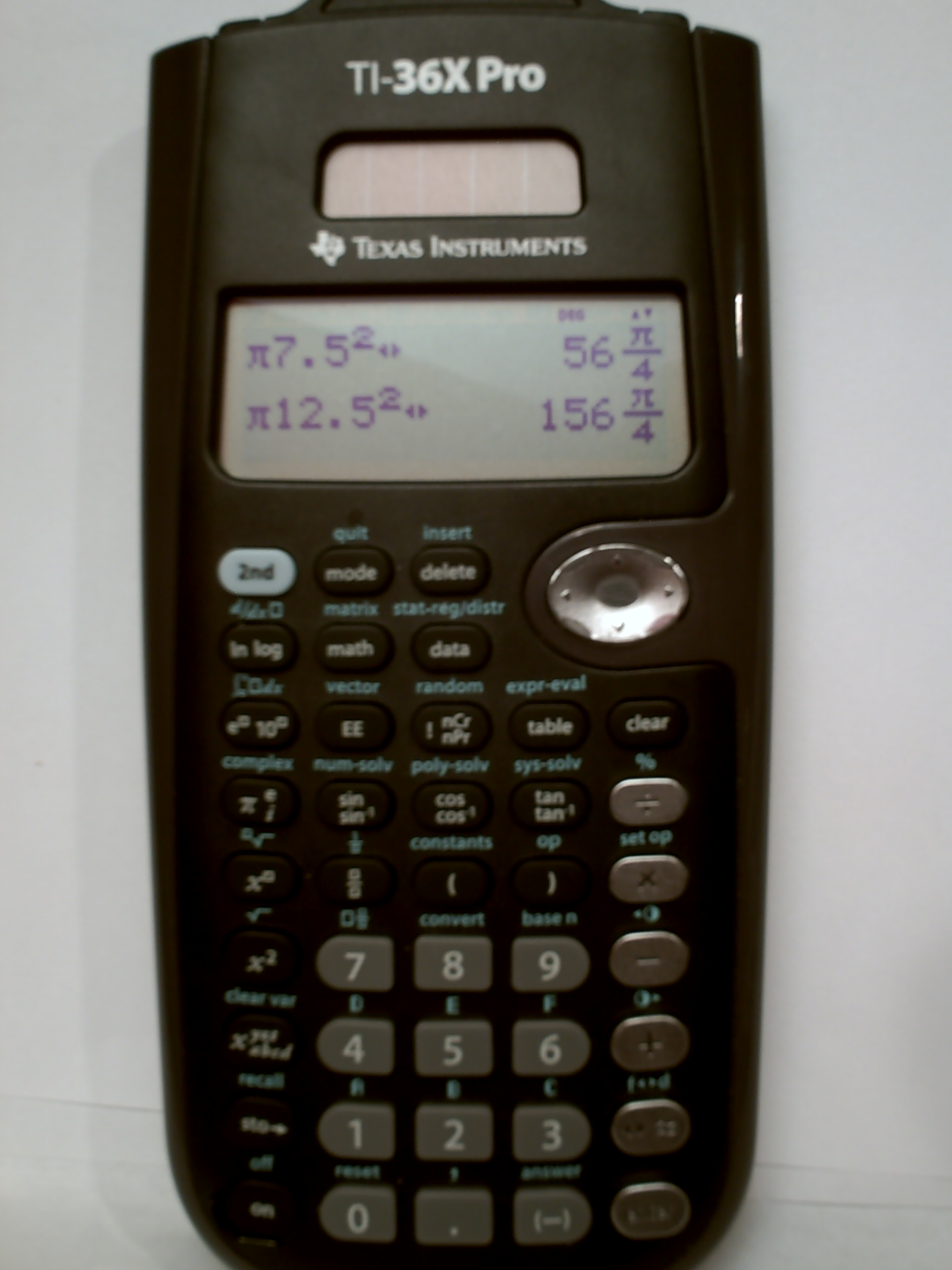
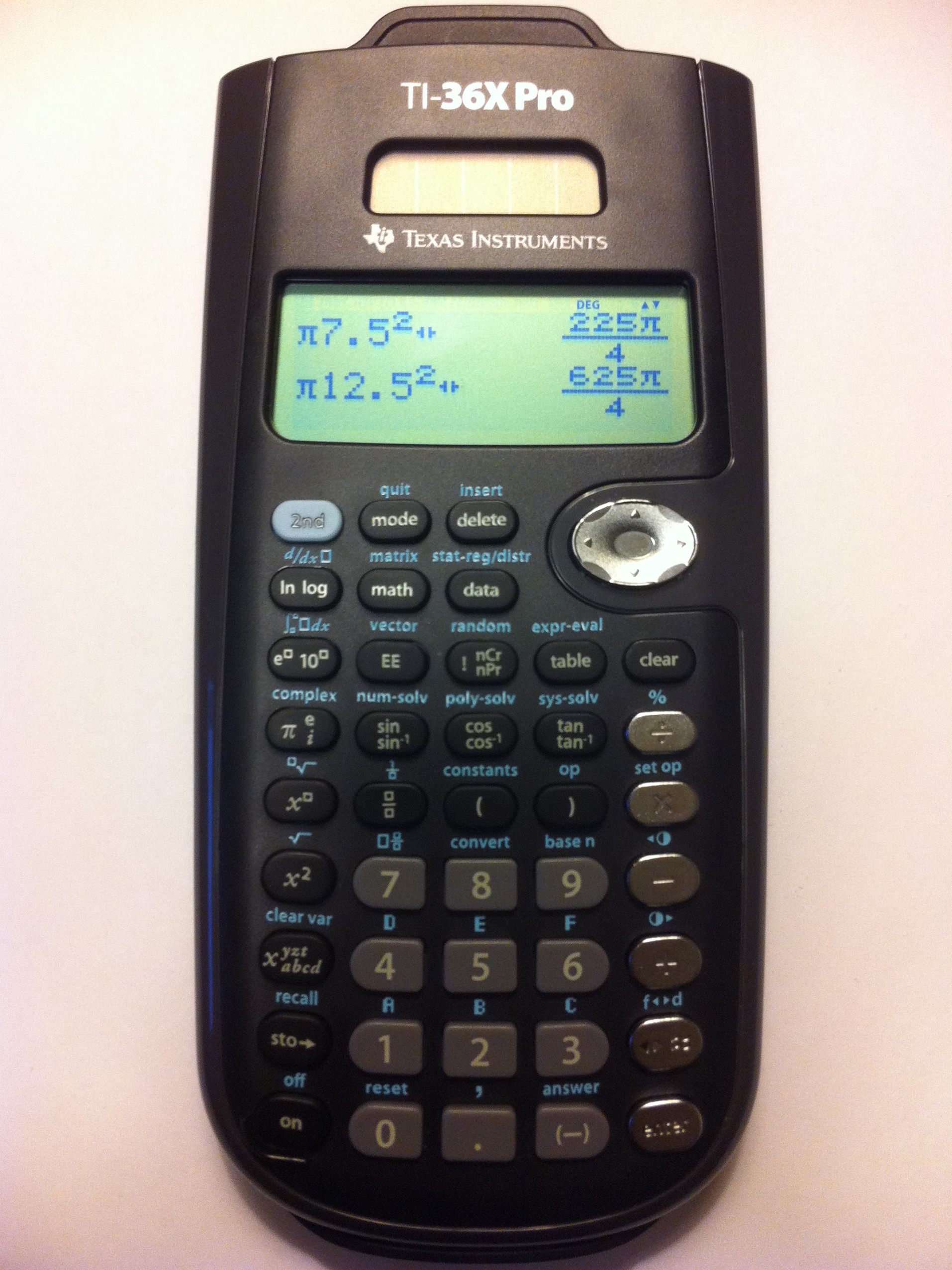
The TI-36X Pro (2011) displaying its programming bug, with incorrect answers (left), and the correct answers after a reset (right).

2011 brought a significant overhaul to the TI-36 series called the TI-36X Pro. This model incorporates the multi-line dot matrix display already used in the TI-30 and 34 MultiView series calculators. This display allows the calculator to perform numeric derivatives and integrals in a way similar to the much more advanced TI-83 series graphing calculators.

Maximum expression length is reduced to 80 characters.

Registers were increased to 8 for memory, 1 for formula (44 characters), and can store up to 3 list formulas (up to 42 characters or items).

Physical constants are increased by 4 to 20, conversion sets are increased to 40 (20 pairs).

Binary mode is restored for Base calculation.

Other new functions over TI-36X II include:

- Math: Least common multiple, Greatest common divisor, Prime factors (from TI-Collège Plus), Summation, Product
- Number functions: Rounded value, iPart(Integer part of a number), fPart(Fractional part of a number), int(Greatest integer smaller or equal to the number), min(Minimum of two numbers), max(Maximum of two numbers), mod(Modulo)
- Calculus: numeric derivative (symmetric difference quotient method)
- 2-variable statistics: quadratic and cubic regressions
- Distribution functions: normal probability density function at mean=0 and sigma=1 (f(x), probability between x boundaries), inverse cumulative normal distribution function for a given area under the normal distribution curve with user-specified mean and standard deviation, probability at x for the discrete binomial distribution with user specified trial number and probability of success per trial, cumulative probability at x for binomial distribution with specified trial number and probability of success per trial, probability at x for Poisson distribution with the specified mean, cumulative probability at x for Poisson distribution with the specified mean
- Statistics results: Minimum/maximum of x values, 25/75-percentile (from TI-Collège Plus)
- Function table: formula-based generator, manual table
- Matrix: 3 editable tables, preset 2x2 and 3x3 identity matrices, matrix arithmetic (addition, subtraction, scalar/vector multiplication, matrix-vector multiplication (vector interpreted as column))
- Vector: 3 editable tables, preset last matrix/vector result, vector arithmetic (addition, subtraction, scalar multiplication, matrix-vector multiplication (vector interpreted as column)), dot product, cross product
- Polynomial solver: 2nd/3rd degree solver.
- Linear equation solver: 2x2 and 3x3 solver.
- Base-N operations: XNOR, NAND
- Expression evaluation
- Complex numbers: polar coordinates entry, polar/Cartesian display mode, angle for complex number

=== Programming errors ===
The TI-36X Pro is an updated version of the European model, the TI-30X Pro MultiView, which was taken off the market shortly after its release in 2010 because of programming errors. While the 30X's bugs were fixed for relaunch as the 36X Pro, the updated version contains a notable software bug of its own, where it displays mixed numbers involving π incorrectly. In such cases, the display shows π in the numerator of the fraction, instead of as a separate coefficient.

Converting °C to Kelvin within a fraction causes a display bug to appear (the K appears as a space instead)

Conversions involving Kelvin incorrectly display °K, when it should just be K.

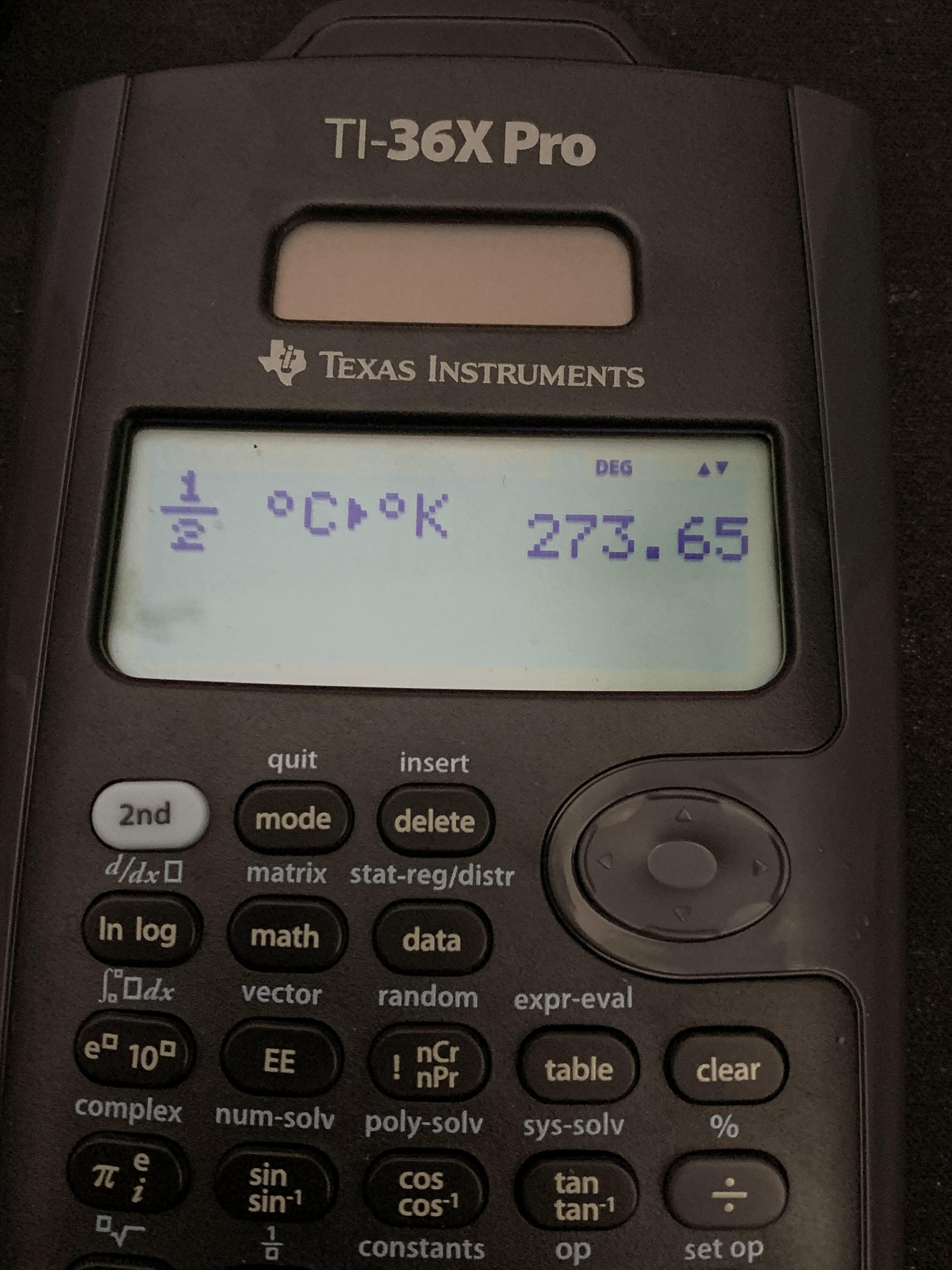
The TI-36X Pro's Celsius to Kelvin bug

In the main constants menu, there is a bug on the sixteenth menu entry for atomic mass unit, "u", which should display as "Atomic Mass U". When this entry is displayed in the top row, then scrolled down to the second row, the display incorrectly shows "Atomic Mass Ur", taking on the "r" from the next entry's last character. A similar bug also happens on the second constants menu based on units. The units for the sixteenth entry, "u", are displayed as "kg" normally, but when scrolled to the middle row from the top row, it takes on the last characters of the next entry, becoming "kgPa".

== Usages ==
The TI-36X series is one of the few calculators currently permitted for use on the Fundamentals of Engineering exam. While TI offers other calculators eligible for use on the exam, the TI-36X Pro is the most feature full Texas Instruments calculator permitted. HP and Casio also make calculators permitted on the exam.
