= TI-35 =

Series of scientific calculators

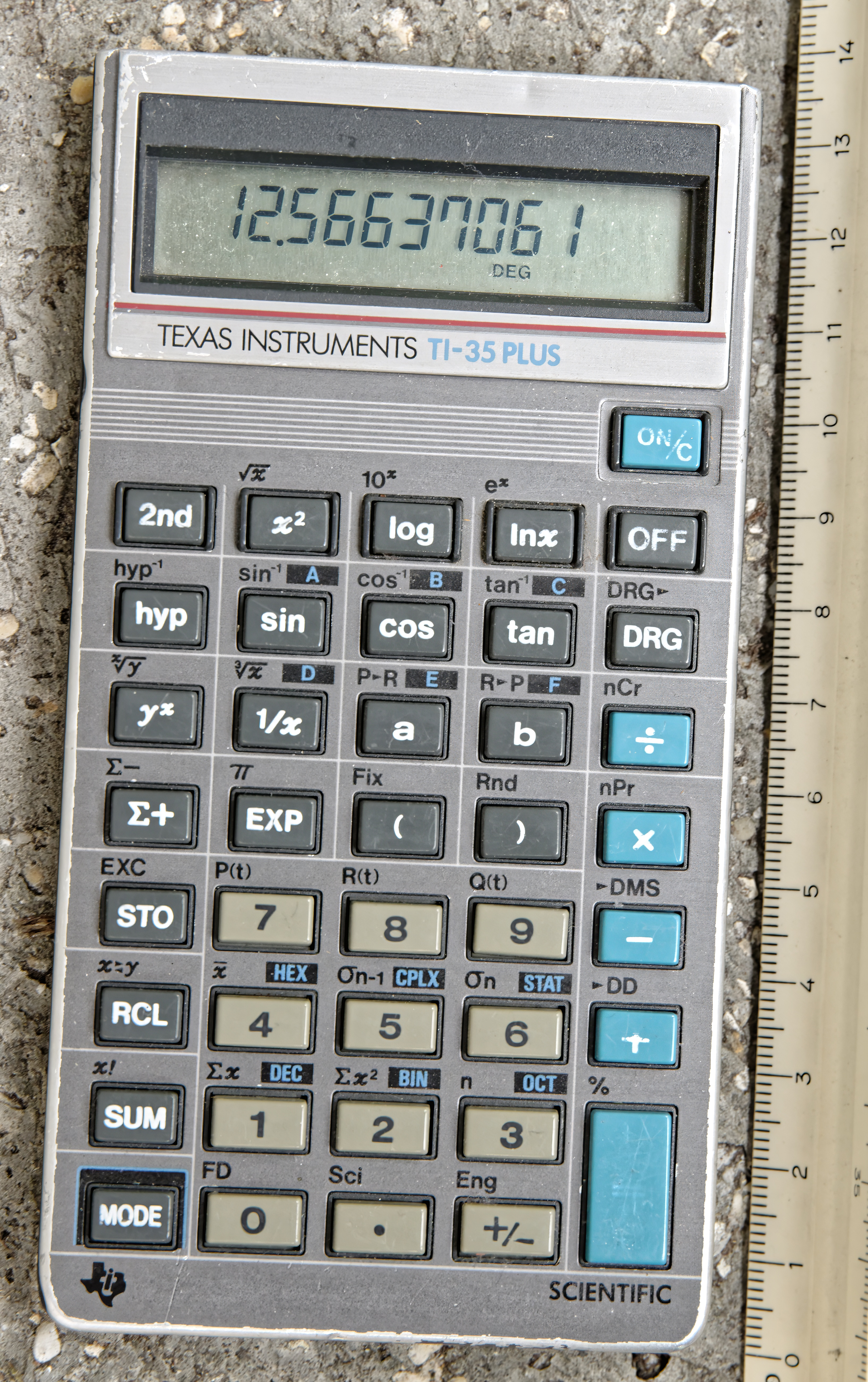
TI-35 plus

Texas Instruments TI-35 is a series of scientific calculators by Texas Instruments. The original TI-35 was notable for being one of Texas Instruments' first use of CMOS controller chips in their designs, and was at the time distinguished from the lower-end TI-30 line by the addition of some statistics functions.

== TI-35 (1979) ==
It was built with the same slimline design as the 1978 TI-30, but with different processor and slightly different set of features.

It used TP0324-4N processor (CMOS variant of TMS1000 family).

The display can handle eight digits (five-digit mantissa with a two-digit exponent) with 11-digit internal precision.

It was manufactured in the USA.

1980

It was a version with TP0324-4NL processor, which increased accuracy.

1982

It was a version with CD4557, which increased accuracy over the TP processor.

Cosmetic updates, include silver shell and new keyboard styling.

It was manufactured in the USA.

== TI-35 (1982) ==
It retained the 1982 styling, but used CD4557 processor.

== TI-35 GALAXY (1984) ==
It is a horizontal variant, but the functionality was identical to the European 1984 TI-30 GALAXY.

Solar version was called TI-35 GALAXY SOLAR.

== TI-35 II (1984) ==
It is a replacement for the 1979 TI-35.

It used TP0456A or CD4557 processor.

It was originally built in Taiwan, but later in Italy and USA.

== TI-35 PLUS (1986) ==
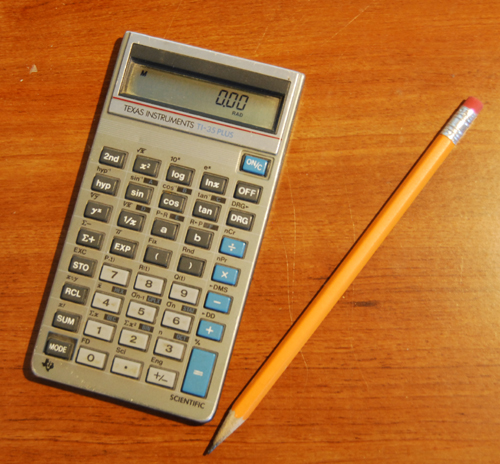
TI-35 Plus

It added hexadecimal and octal calculations and a 10+2 display (i.e. ten-digit mantissa with a two-digit exponent) with 12-digit internal precision.

== TI-35X (1991) ==
The design was based on contemporary TI-68. The cosmetics were updated in 1993.

== End of life ==
Following the update of TI-36X Solar in 1996, the TI-35 designation was discontinued after 10 years of coexisting with the TI-36 line.
