= TI-32 Math Explorer Plus =

Calculator produced by Texas Instruments

The TI-32 Math Explorer Plus is a calculator by Texas Instruments specifically designed for middle school students. The Math Explorer Plus was offered as a more advanced version of the TI-12 Math Explorer. The TI-32 Math Explorer Plus offered trigonometric, exponential, logarithmic, and probability functions, and thus can be considered a true scientific calculator unlike the TI-12 Math Explorer.

The Math Explorer Plus was eventually replaced by the TI-34 II Explorer Plus, which combined features of the TI-32 and TI-34, as well as incorporating a two-line display.
