= TI-68 =

Scientific calculator produced by Texas Instruments

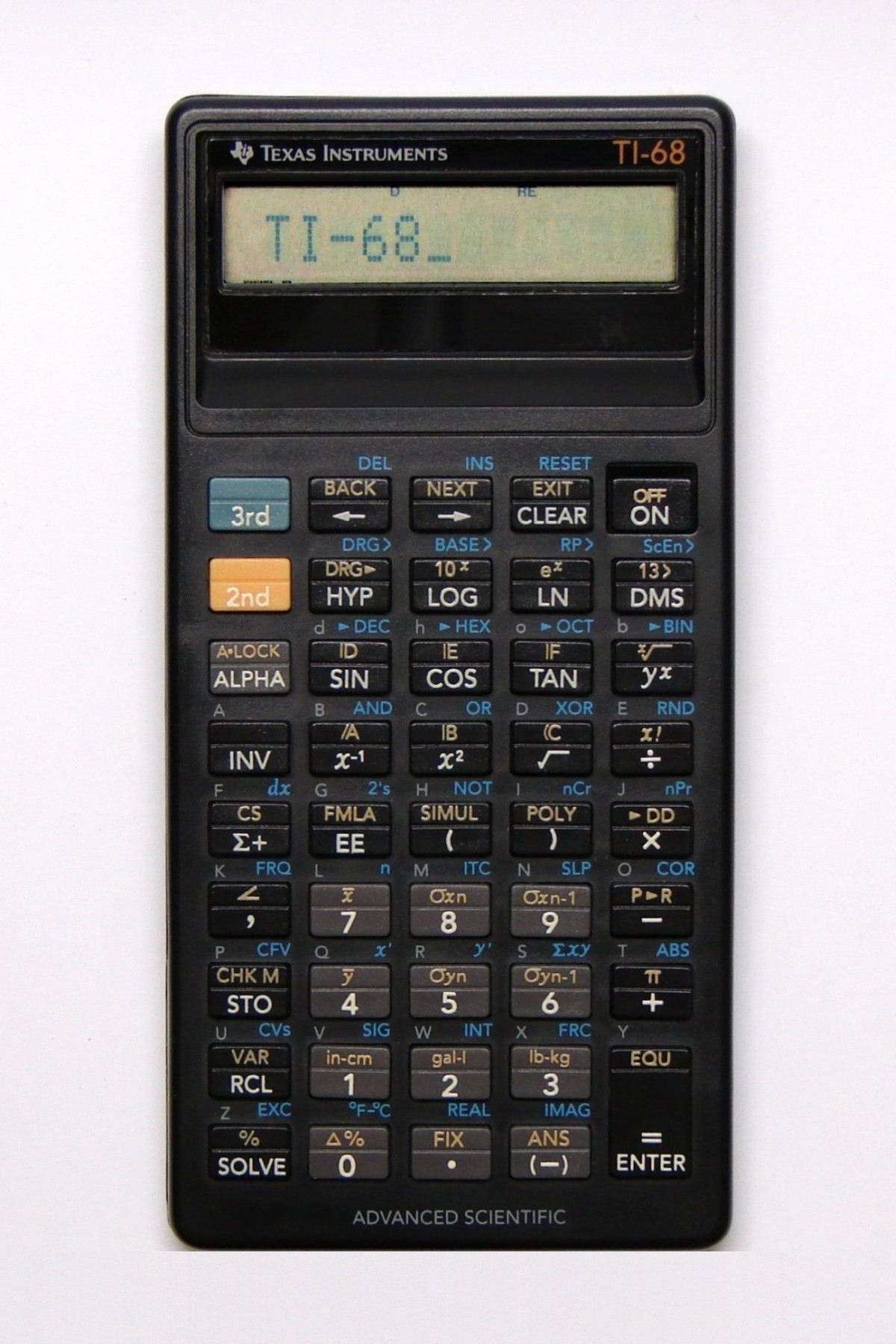
Texas Instruments TI-68

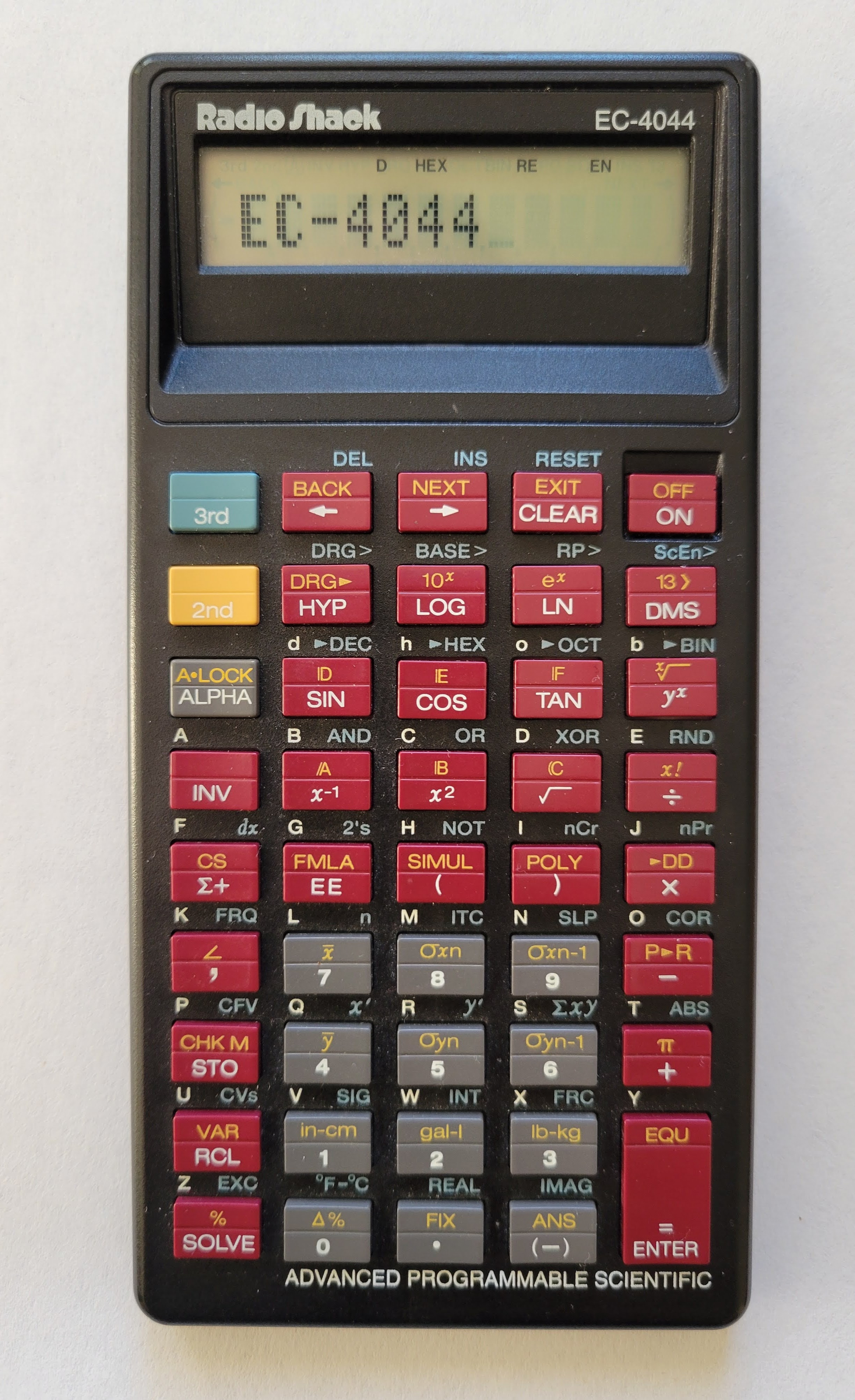
Radio Shack EC-4044

The TI-68 was a scientific pocket/desktop calculator produced by Texas Instruments. It was introduced in 1989 and was modified in 1991 to produce a less expensive and possibly more durable version. The adjacent picture is the later version. It was discontinued in 1997.

A wealth of features made it a versatile calculator. Named variables, and interactive formulas of up to 79 keystrokes, could be stored, subject to a total memory usage of 440 bytes. Some features included a simultaneous equations solver, a polynomial root finder, two-variable statistics, complex numbers, and a recall feature, which would display the last equation entered and its answer. It had several features useful to computer programmers, such as radix modes and conversions and bitset operators. It had an alphanumeric keyboard and display.

It was also offered by Radio Shack as model EC-4044 (Cat. No. 65-808), but in a different color scheme.
