= TI-30 =

Scientific calculator by Texas Instruments

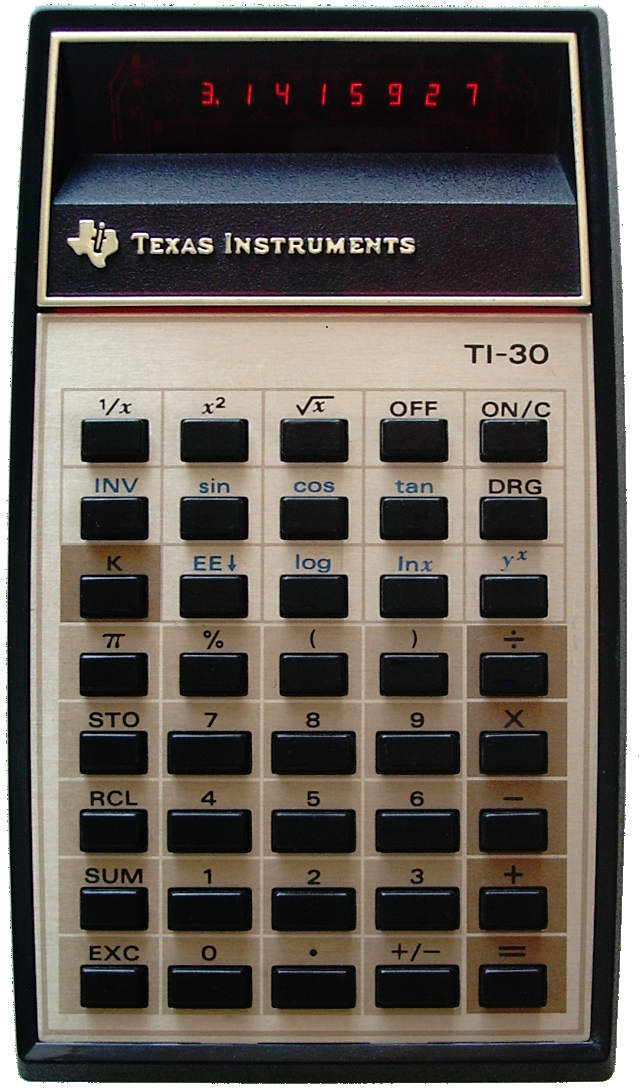
The original TI-30

The TI-30 is a scientific calculator manufactured by Texas Instruments, the first model of which was introduced in 1976. While the original TI-30 was discontinued in 1983 after several design revisions, TI maintains the TI-30 designation as a branding for its low and mid-range scientific calculators.

== Price ==
The original TI-30 was notable for its very low cost for the time, around US$25 (equivalent to $141 in 2025). This was much less than the retail prices of other scientific calculators of the era; for example, Hewlett-Packard's cheapest scientific calculator at the time was still well over $100. The Casio FX-20, another popular scientific calculator, sold for roughly double the price of the TI-30. The TI-30 sold for less than the cost of a professional-grade slide rule. The TI-30 sold an estimated 15 million units during its lifespan from 1976–1983.

== Description ==
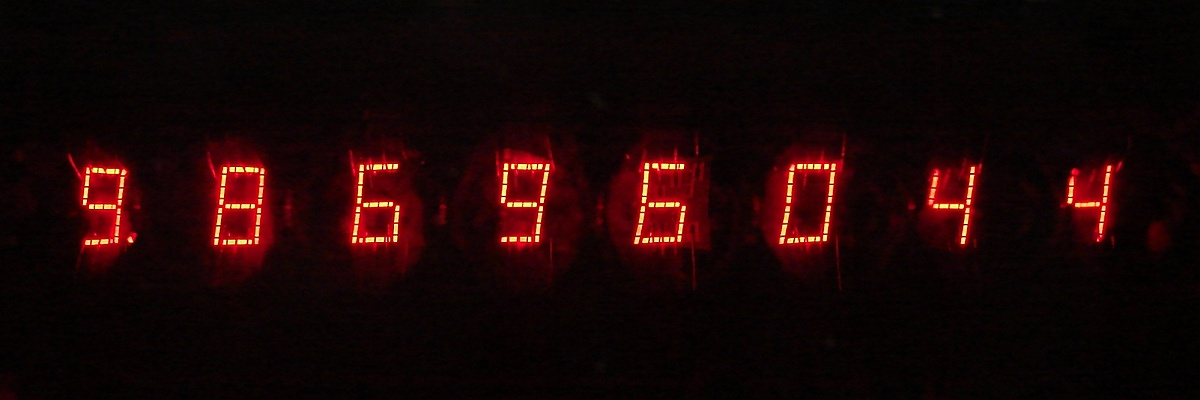
LED display digits of the original TI-30

The original TI-30A, a cost-reduced but functionally equivalent version of TI's SR-40, utilizing an LED display, and was powered by a 9-volt battery, and contained nearly all of its functionality in one chip, where previous calculators used many discrete components. The TI-30 could perform nearly all the logarithmic and trigonometric functions of an HP-21, its primary competition at the time. Although the Texas Instruments SR-50 pioneered algebraic notation with operation precedence in 1974, the TI-30 made those features available at a more affordable price.

Early production TI-30 units (c. 1976) contained a logic error in their calculation of inverse tangents. On these early models, pressing "0 INV TAN" (tan^{−1}(0) on today's models (TI-30X Plus MathPrint)) would cause the calculator to go into an infinite loop until it is powered off with the OFF button. The "0" had to be pressed on the keyboard; the calculator produced a correct answer if the "0" was the result of a previous calculation.

The TI-30 was at one point the most popular scientific calculator for junior high and high school use in the United States. For $24.95, the purchaser received both the calculator and a 224-page book, The Great International Math on Keys Book, which covered basics in algebra, business and finance, trigonometry, probability and statistics, physics and chemistry, and had ideas for games and puzzles that could be played with the calculator.

In 1980, Texas Instruments converted the TI-30 to use a liquid crystal display, releasing the TI-30 LCD in Europe and the TI-30 II a year later in the U.S. The calculator itself remained functionally similar over several redesigns in the following few years, with solar power coming to the line in 1982 in a joint venture with Toshiba. The "X" in all current TI-30 models refers to the addition of a 10+2 display (that is, a 10 digit mantissa plus a 2-digit exponent) in 1993; with the addition of a 2-line display and a D-pad in the XIIS/XIIB in 1999, the TI-30 line split in 2, with the TI-30Xa becoming TI's overall entry-level scientific, and the enhanced XII designs offering more input flexibility to the user. The MultiView models, introduced in 2006 and 2007, replace the 2-line display with a dot matrix display similar to a graphing calculator, and move many of the functions traditionally placed on or next to individual calculator keys off onto menus very similar to those used on the popular TI-83 calculator line.

At one time or another, most models in the line since the introduction of the LCD models have been available in both solar powered and battery versions; the Xa retains solar power only on models sold in a few markets in Europe, while the XIIS and XS MultiView models run off both solar and battery power depending on available ambient light. The earliest model, however, uses a 9 volt battery, which is expected to last for approximately 20 hours of use, according to the Owner's Manual. However, two rechargeable kits were offered, the RK-1 and the RK-2, which each contained a battery allowing for two hours and four hours of continuous use, respectively, before needing to be recharged.

The TI-36 and 30 series are among one of the only calculator models permitted on the FE engineering exam in the USA, alongside the Casio FX-115 and 991 series, and the discontinued HP 35 series of calculators.

== TI-30 models ==
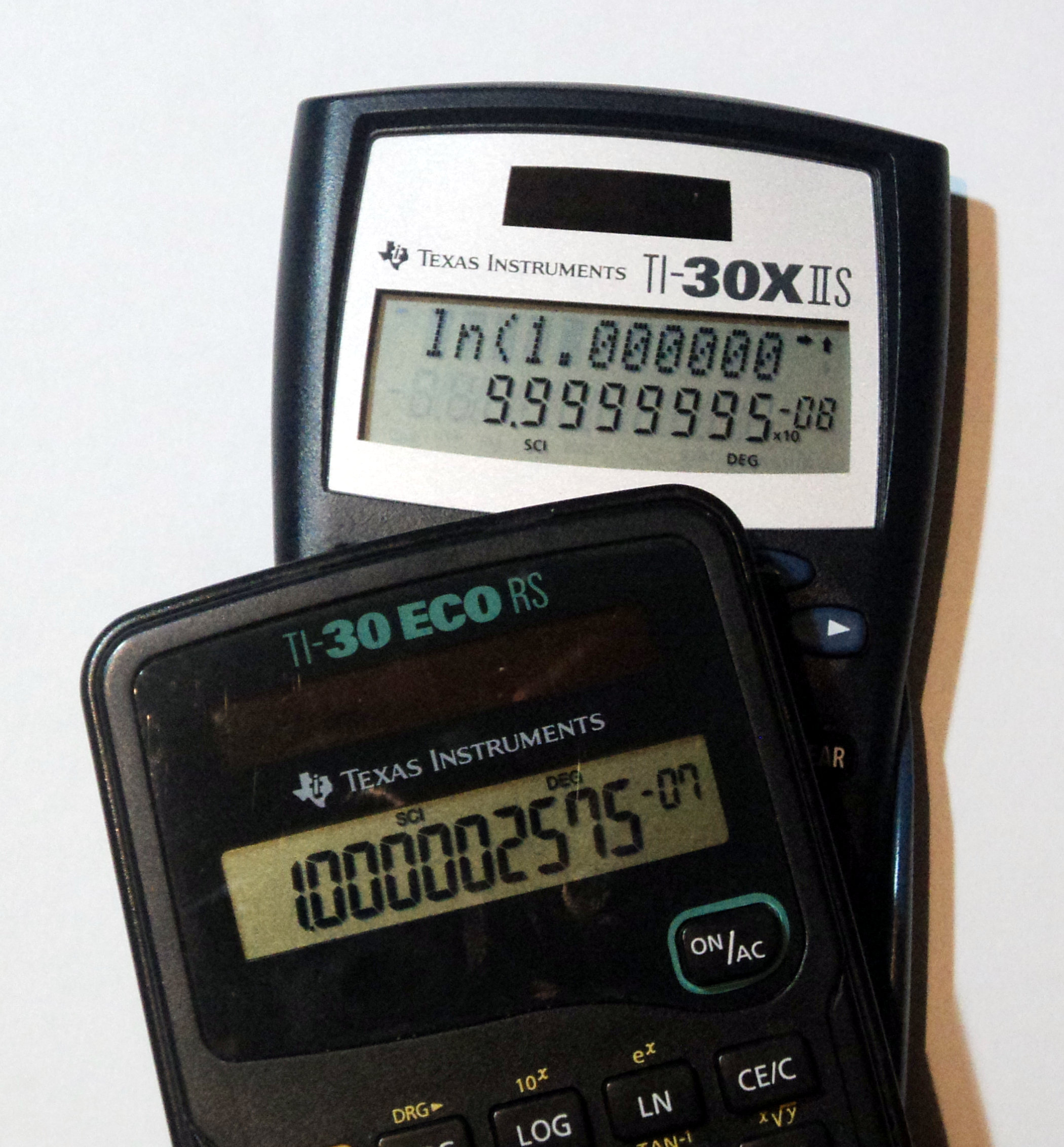
Demonstration of the so-called "logarithm bug" that exists in some TI-30 models. In both cases, the value of ln(1.0000001) was calculated. The TI-30 Eco RS shows the incorrect answer, but the TI-30X shows the correct answer.

- TI-30 (1976): first version; LED display
- TI-30 LCD (1978): the first LCD version. European market only. In 1986, TI had a recall (at least in Germany) where they offered replacement due to (possible) defects. TI-30 replacement free of charge, or TI-31 Solar with 10,- DM payment. Other models replaced were the TI-55II, TI-35 and TI-57LCD.
- TI-30 II (1981): slimline format with the TI-30 key layout
- TI-30 III (1984)
- TI-30 SLR (1982): with Toshiba calculating chip. It had 9 digits of calculating precision. (US units had 11 digits at that time.)
- TI-30 SLR+ (1987): solar
- TI-30 Stat (1988): added basic statistical functions
- TI-30 Galaxy: part of a line of landscape format calculators from the mid-1980s
- TI-30X (1993): the X signifies an expanded 10 digit display (from the original 8). Switching to a new circuit board design introduced a logarithm bug.
- TI-30Xa (1994): added the constant key to the TI-30X (26 EUUUBAH)
- TI-30Xa (rev 1996): introduced a more modern, smoothed design. Currently the bottom of the TI-30 line, the Xa has a standard one-line, 10+2 digit display. The solar-powered eco RS model is available only in Europe.
- TI-30Xa Solar School Edition (2004): a modified version of the TI-30Xa, without the fraction buttons. This calculator is approved for Virginia State Testing.
- TI-30X IIS and TI-30X IIB (1998): added a two-line, scrollable display and a D-pad for navigating previous results. Solar/battery and battery powered respectively.
- TI-30XS and TI-30XB MultiView (2005): first non-graphing TI calculators with a dot-matrix display; able to display expressions in textbook-style notation. Uses a command syntax similar to TI-BASIC, but with no programming capability.
- TI-30X Pro MultiView and TI-36X Pro (2011): In addition to the features TI-30XS and TI-30XB MultiView, it features a solver, availability to calculate matrices, vectors, integrals, complex numbers and convert different units. The TI-36X Pro is the American and international version of the European model, the TI-30X Pro MultiView. The TI-30X Pro MultiView was released in 2010 and then promptly recalled because of programming errors. It was re-released in 2011.
- TI-30XA (2013): retained the size and shape of the 1996 model, having buttons rounded on the bottom, and the color of the "2nd" button changed from yellow to green. With introduction of a new circuit board in 2015 the logarithm bug was fixed, also the calculator switched to using just one 1.5V battery instead of two.
- TI-30X Plus MultiView (2015): a TI-30X Pro MultiView without certain advanced features. Only released in Germany, Austria, and Switzerland to meet the requirements of certain high schools that ban the removed features.
- TI-30X Pro MathPrint™ and TI-30X Plus MathPrint™ (2018): successors of TI-30X Pro MultiView/TI-36X Pro and TI-30X Plus MultiView. Both have a modern design, a higher resolution display and some other improvements such as a slightly faster processing speed. Currently only available in certain EU countries and unavailable to US markets.
- Ti-30X IIS (rev 2024): introduced a new color pallet for the numerical keys so that they matched the operational keys.
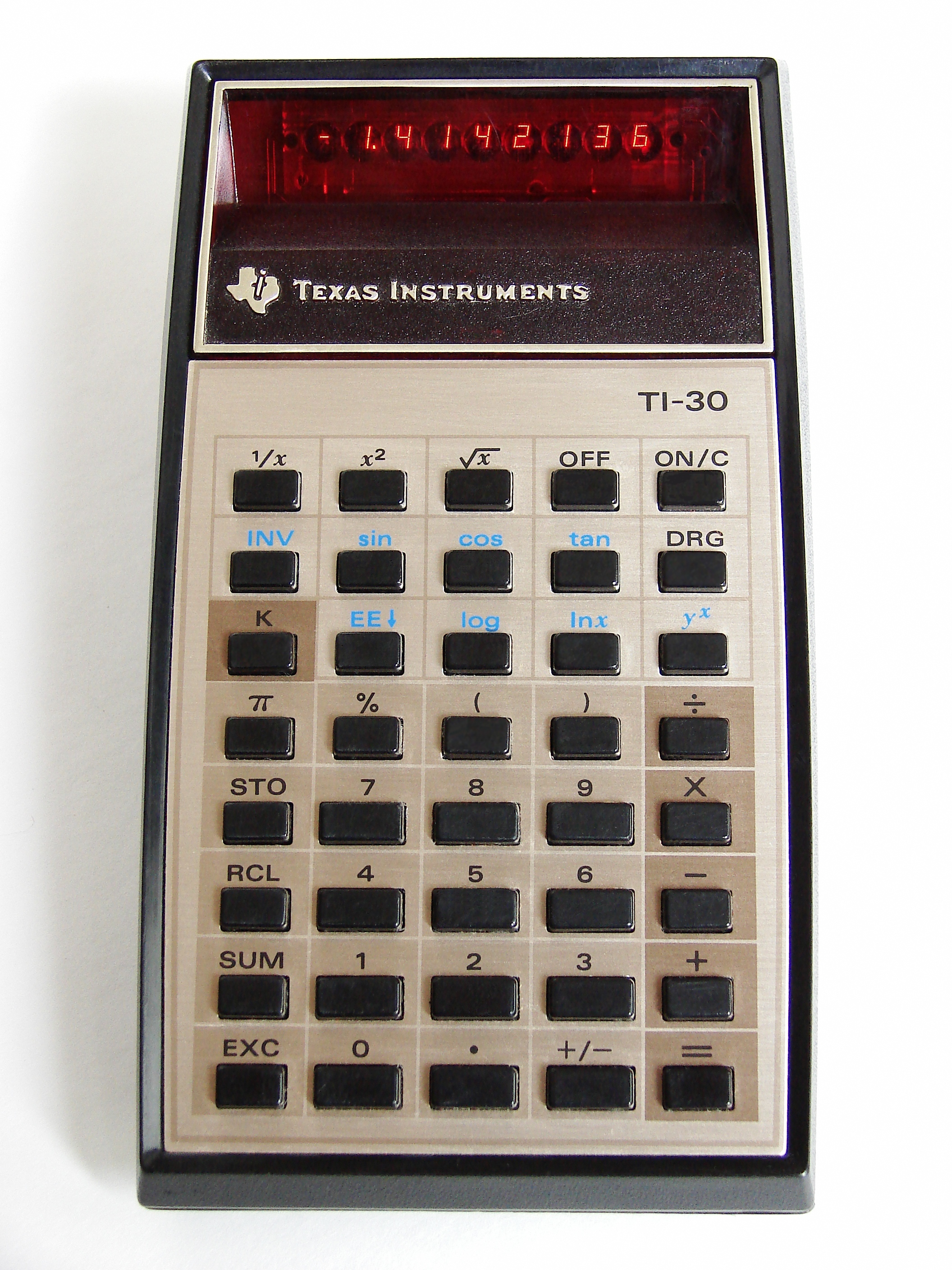
Original TI-30 model (ca. 1979) with LED display

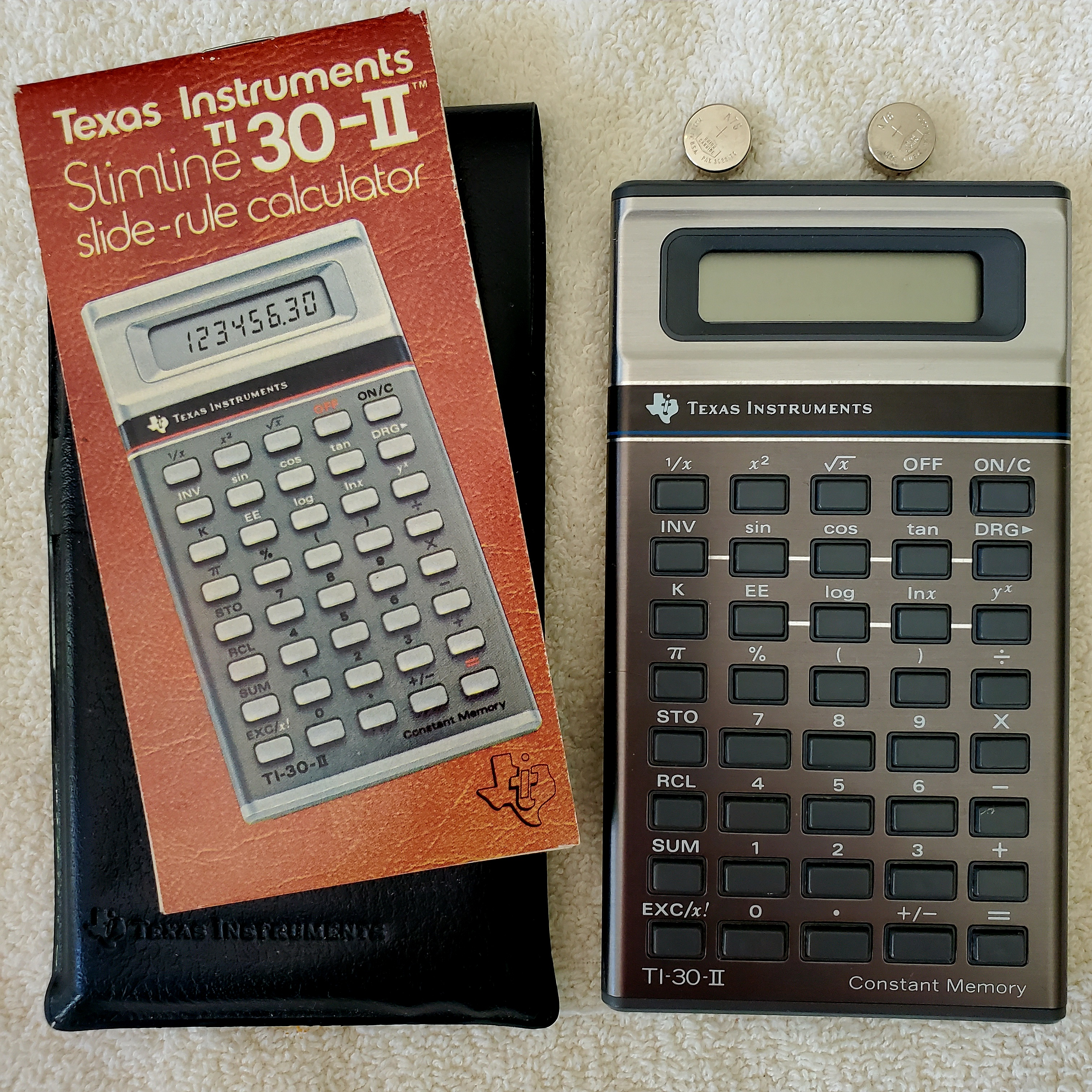
TI-30-II calculator, manual, case and batteries

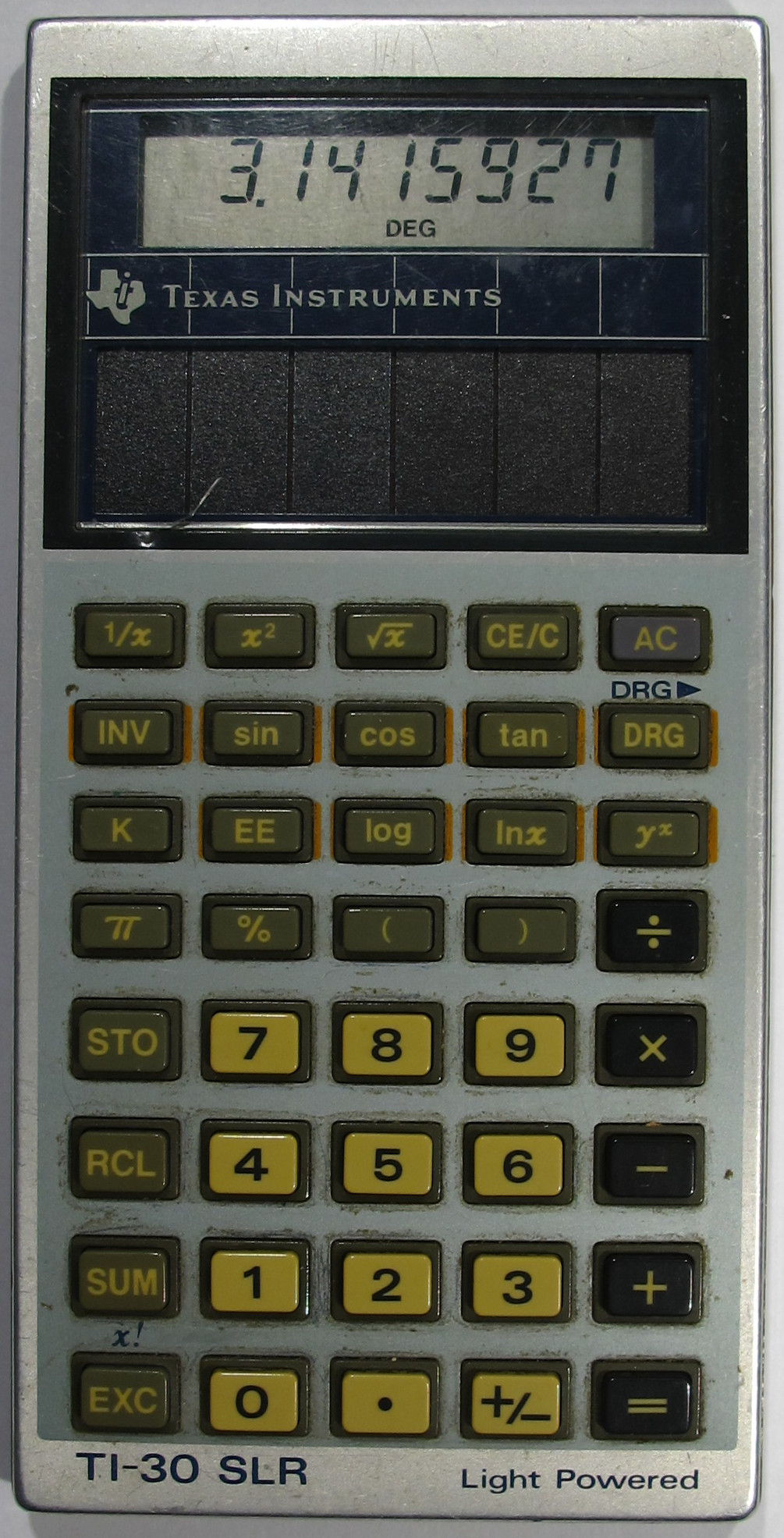
TI-30 SLR

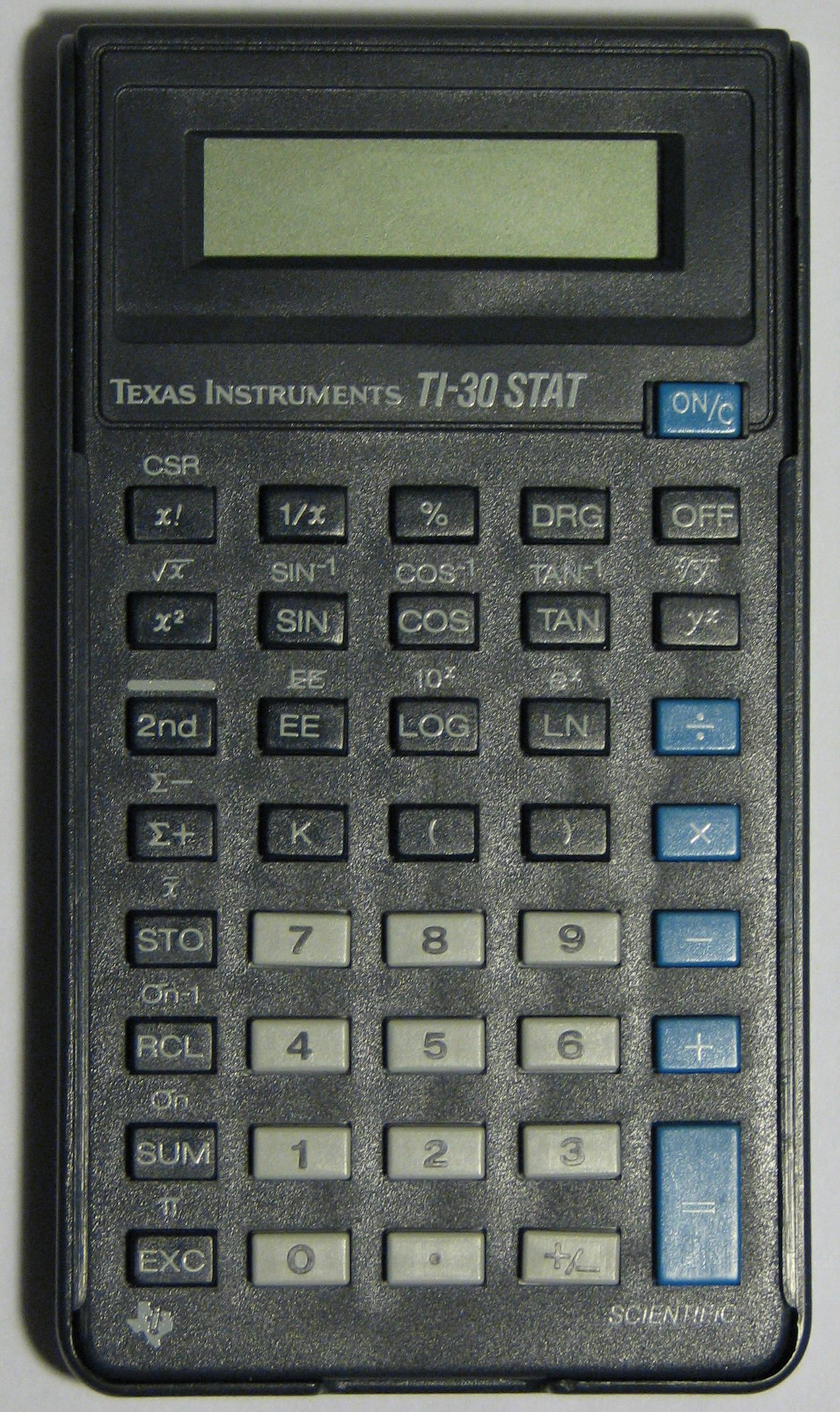
TI-30 Stat

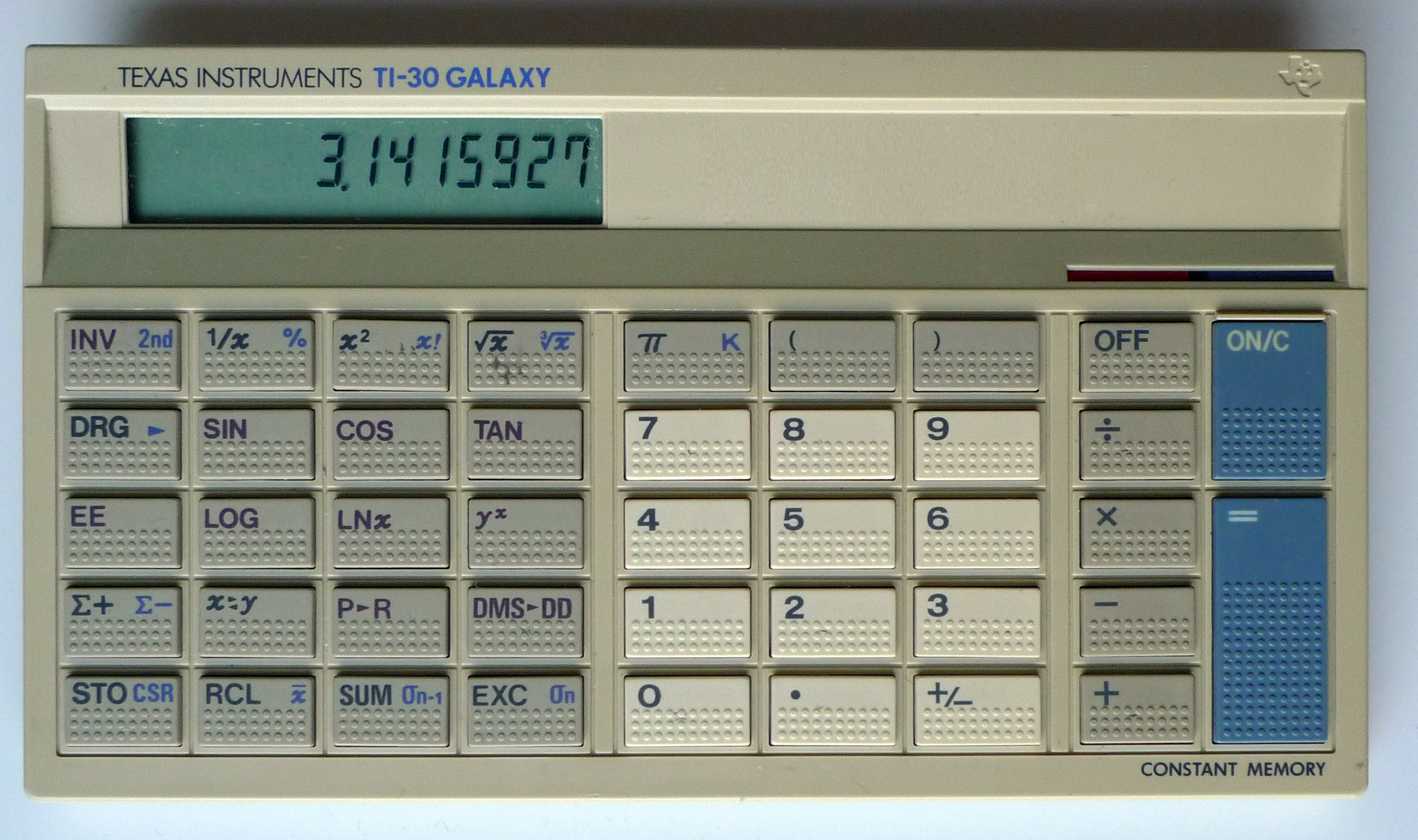
TI-30 Galaxy

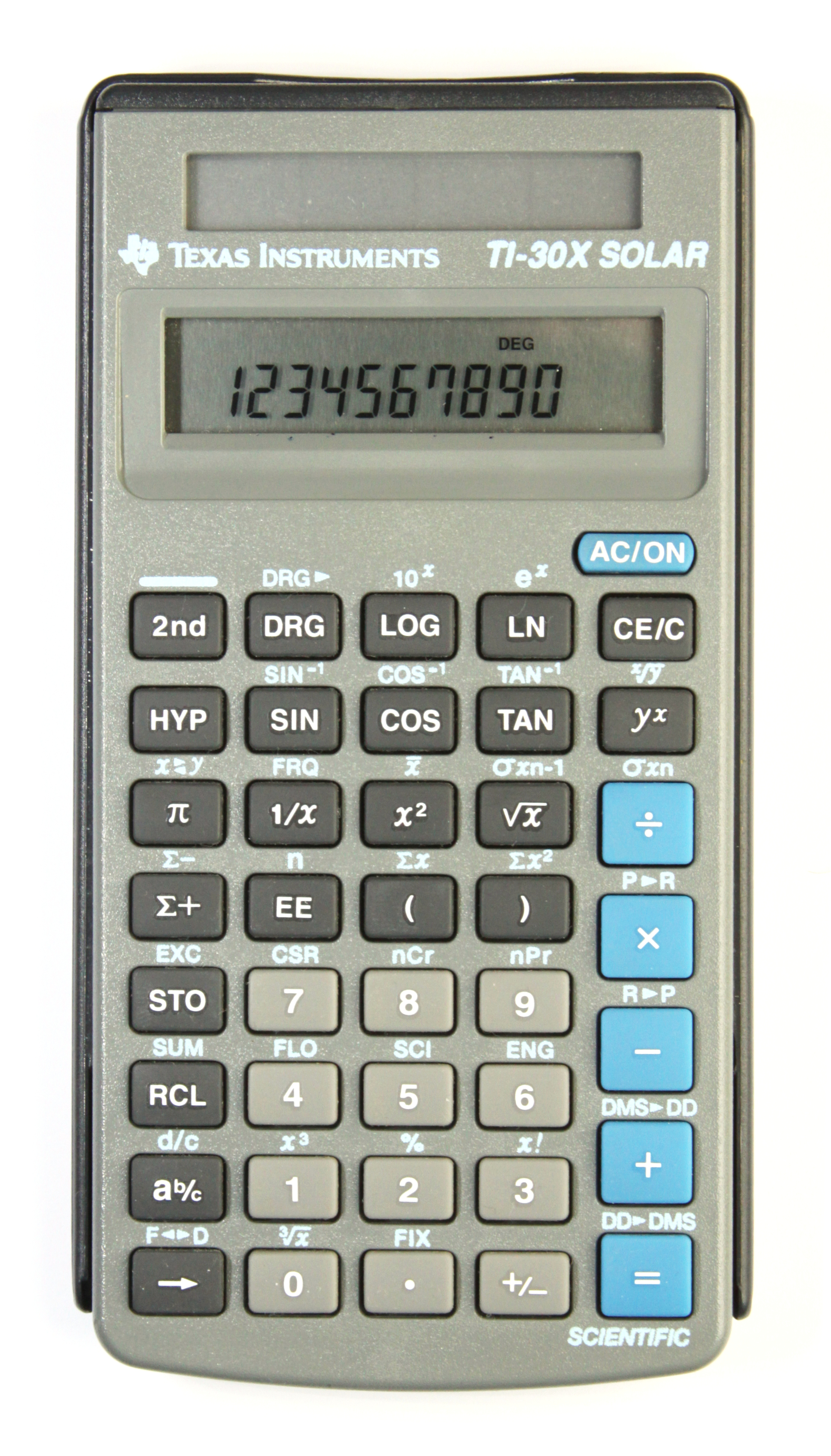
TI-30X SOLAR

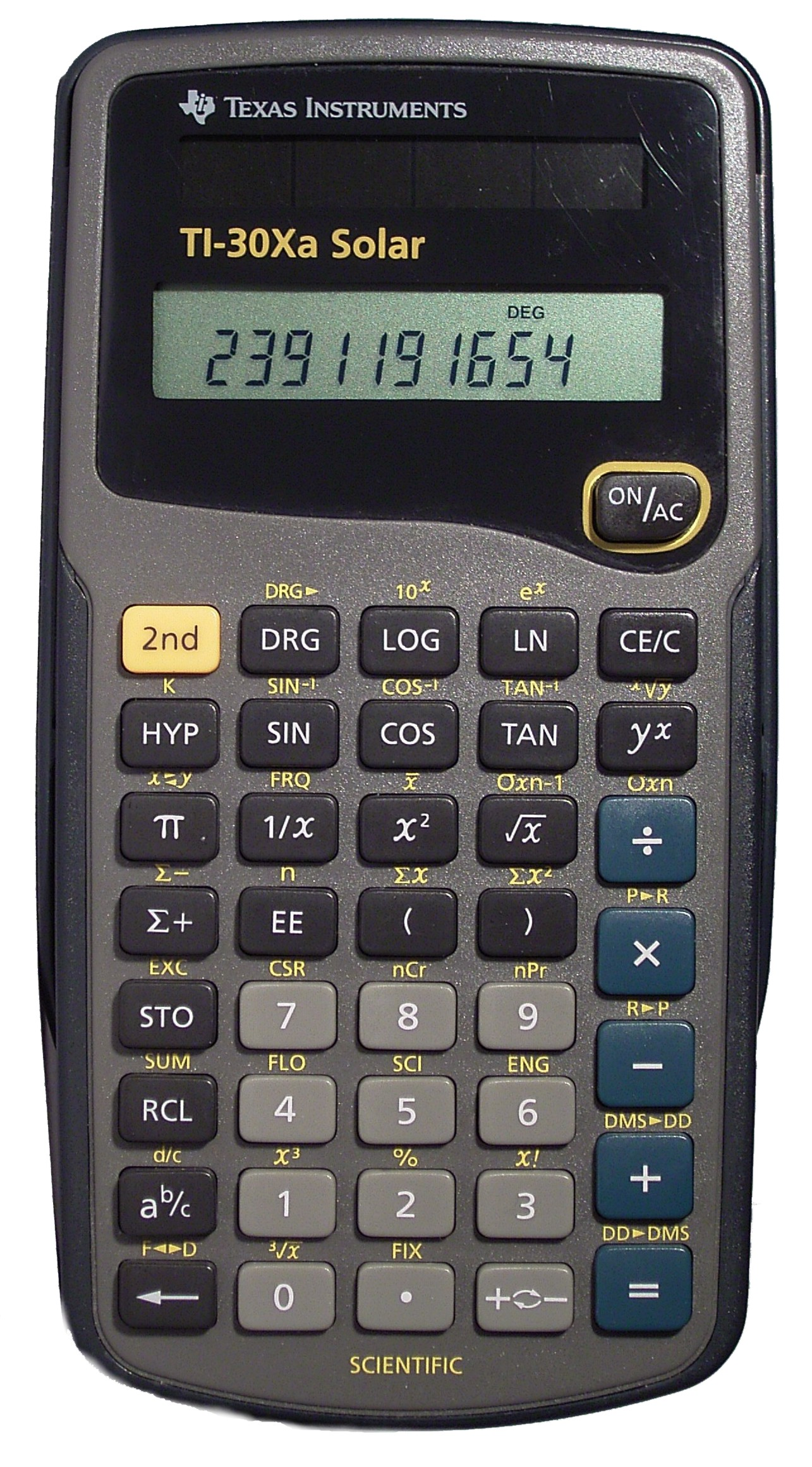
TI-30Xa Solar (1996 revision)

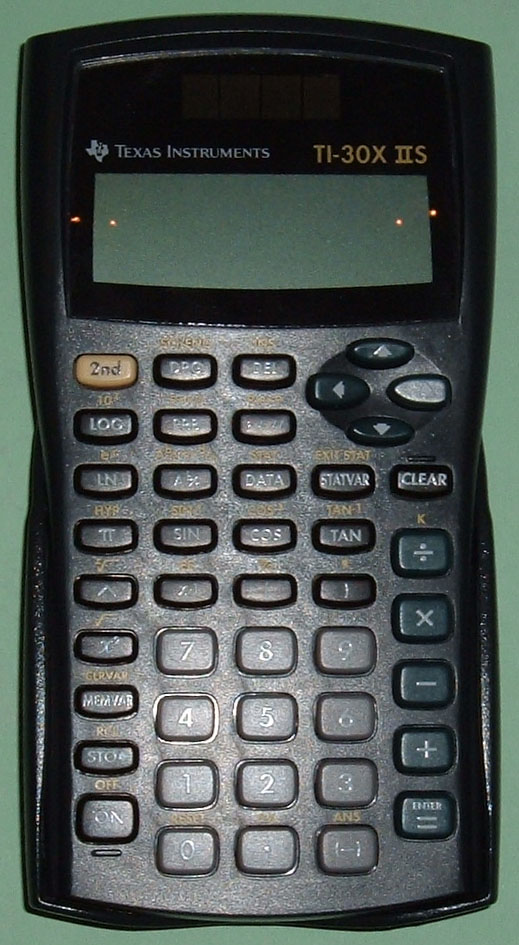
The pre-2004 TI-30X IIS

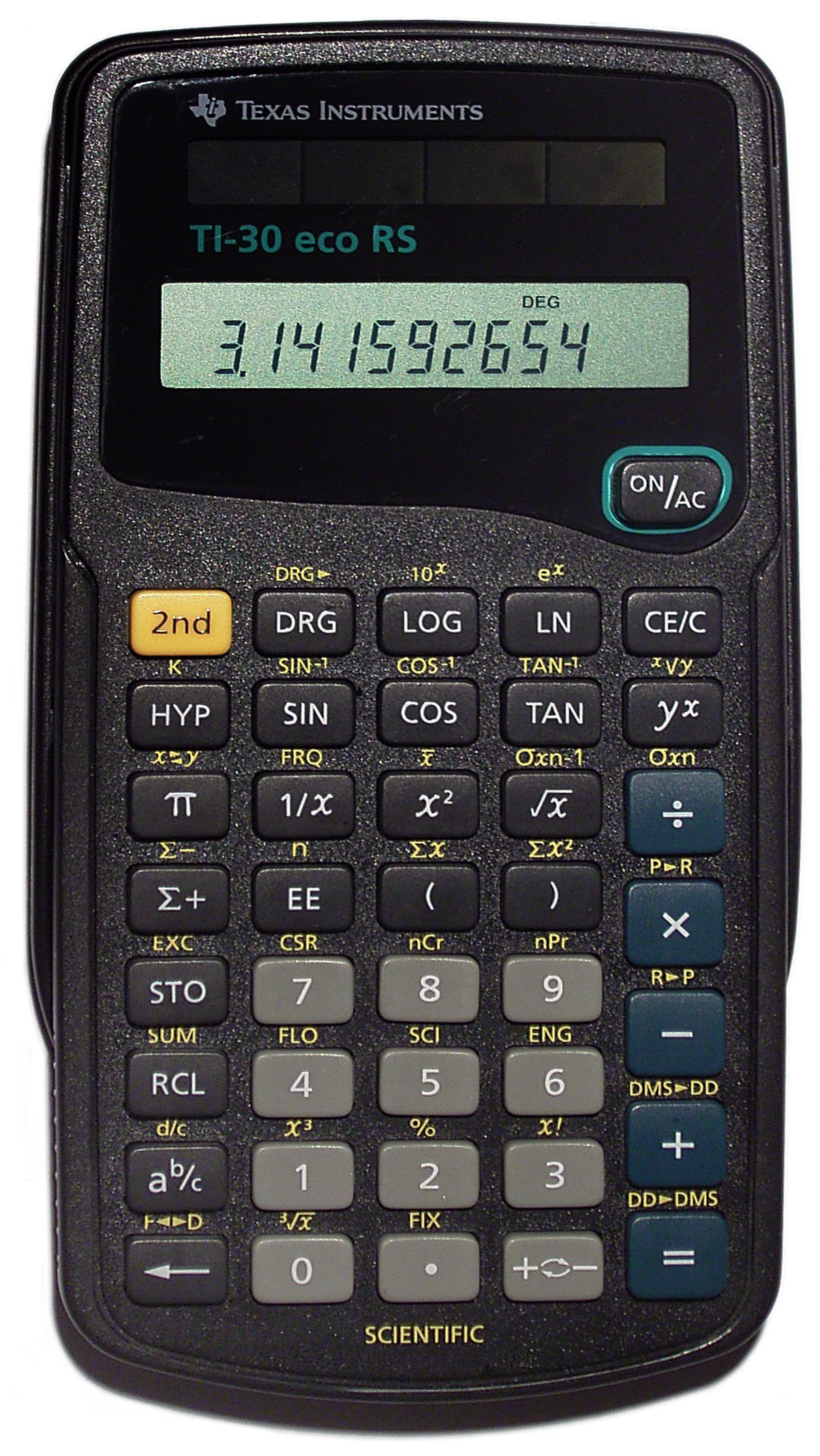
TI-30 eco RS

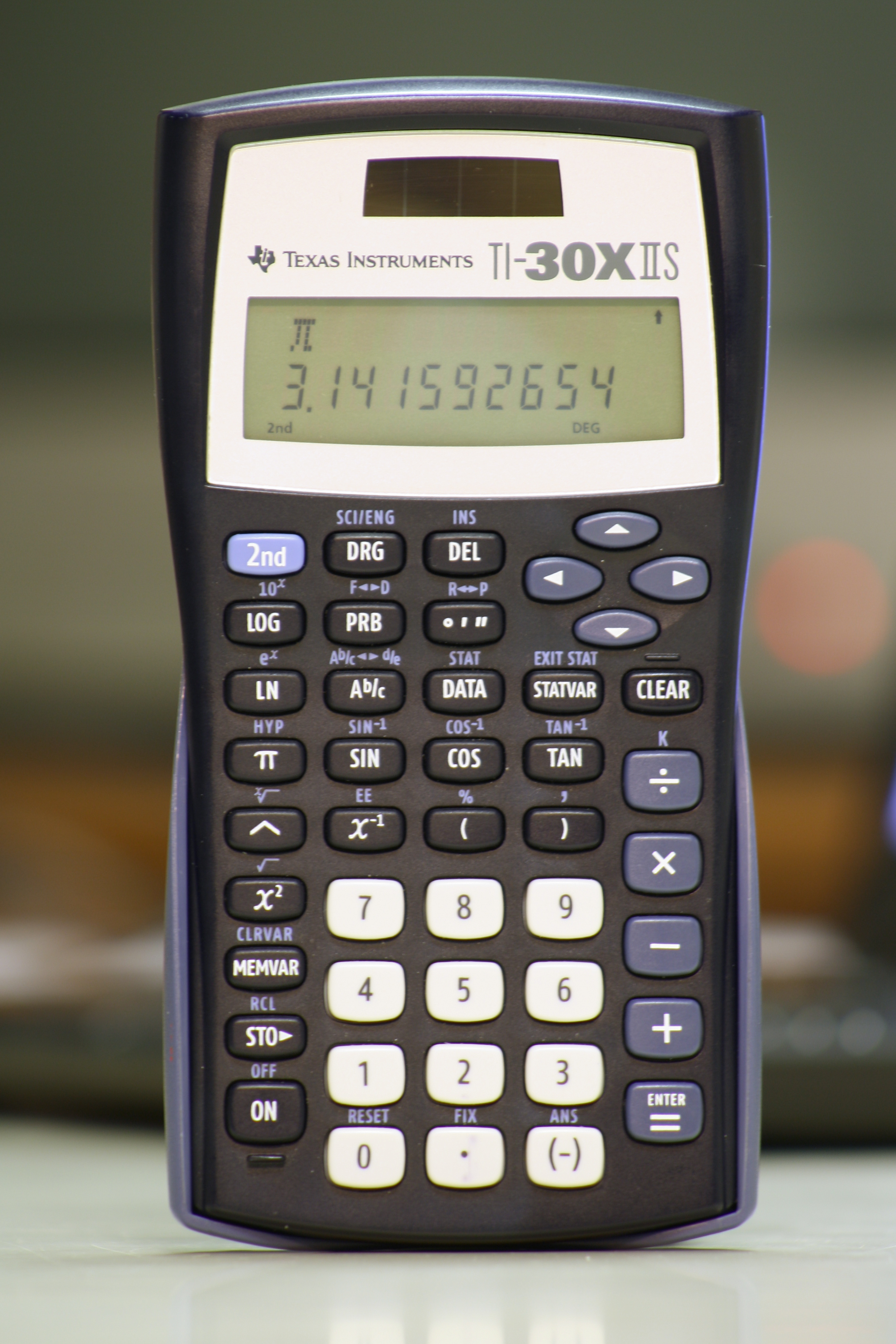
TI-30X IIS (2004 revision)

TI-30XA (2004 revision)

TI-30XS Multiview

TI-30XB Multiview

TI-30X Plus Multiview

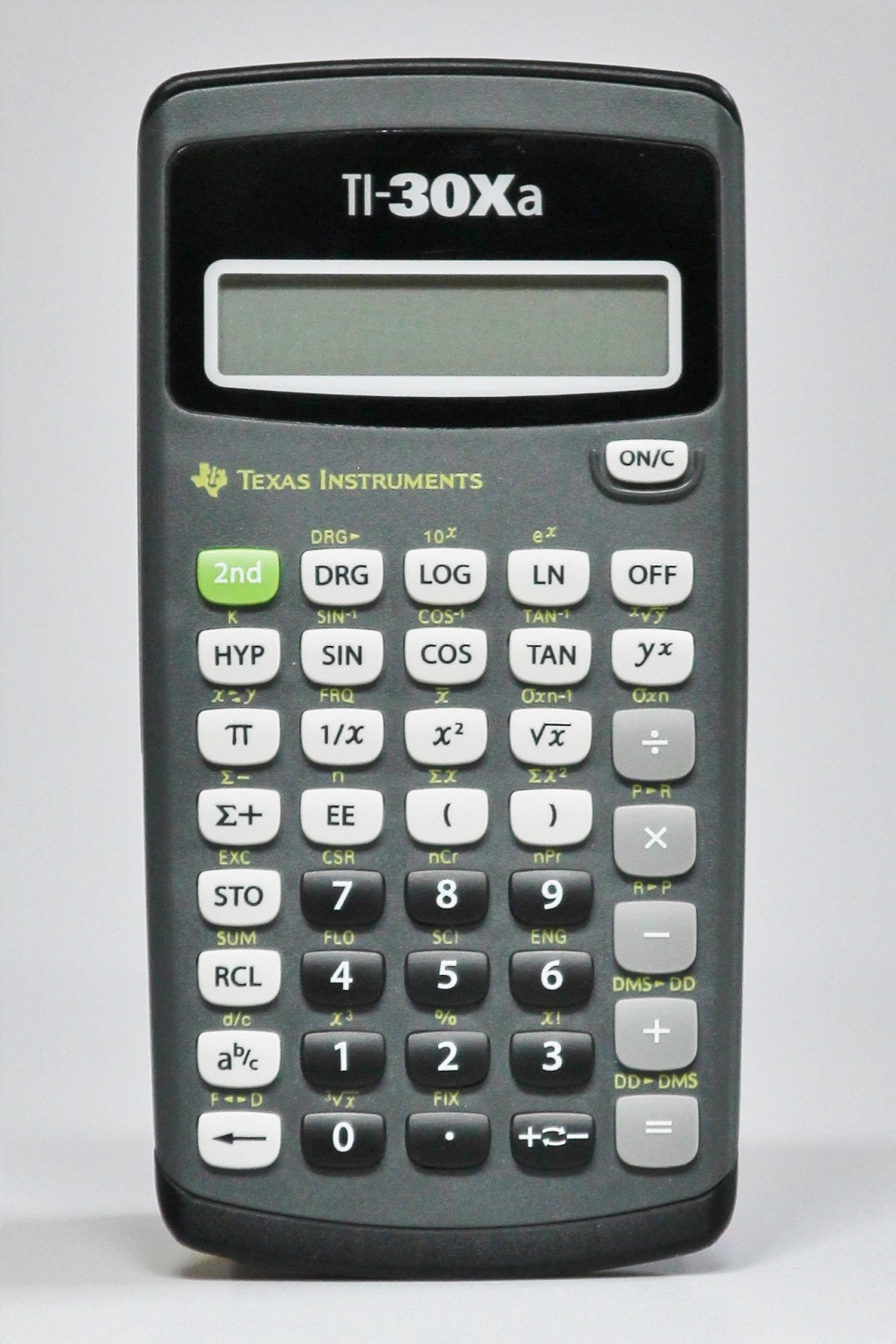
TI-30XA (2013 revision)

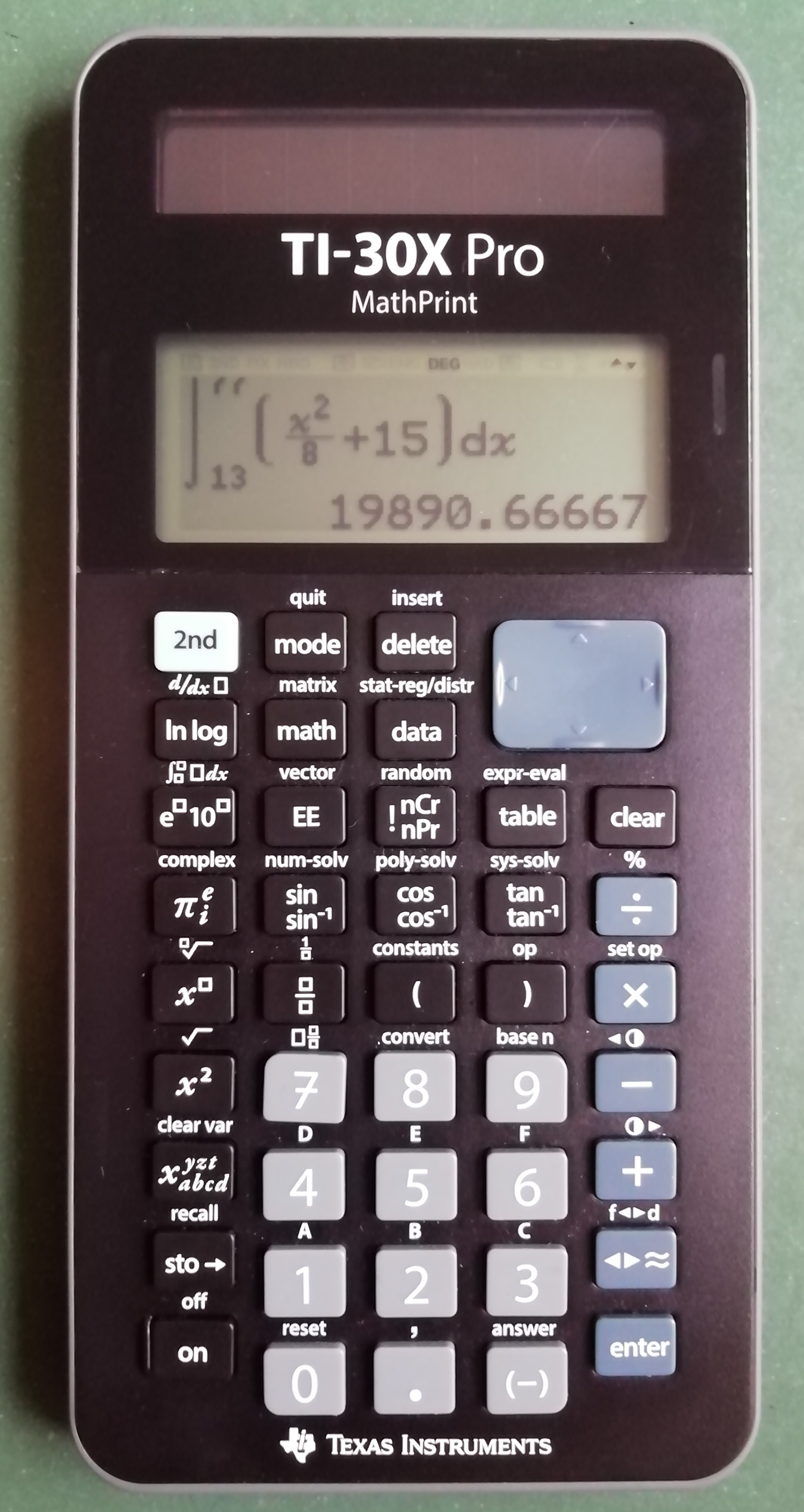
TI-30X Pro MathPrint (2018 revision)

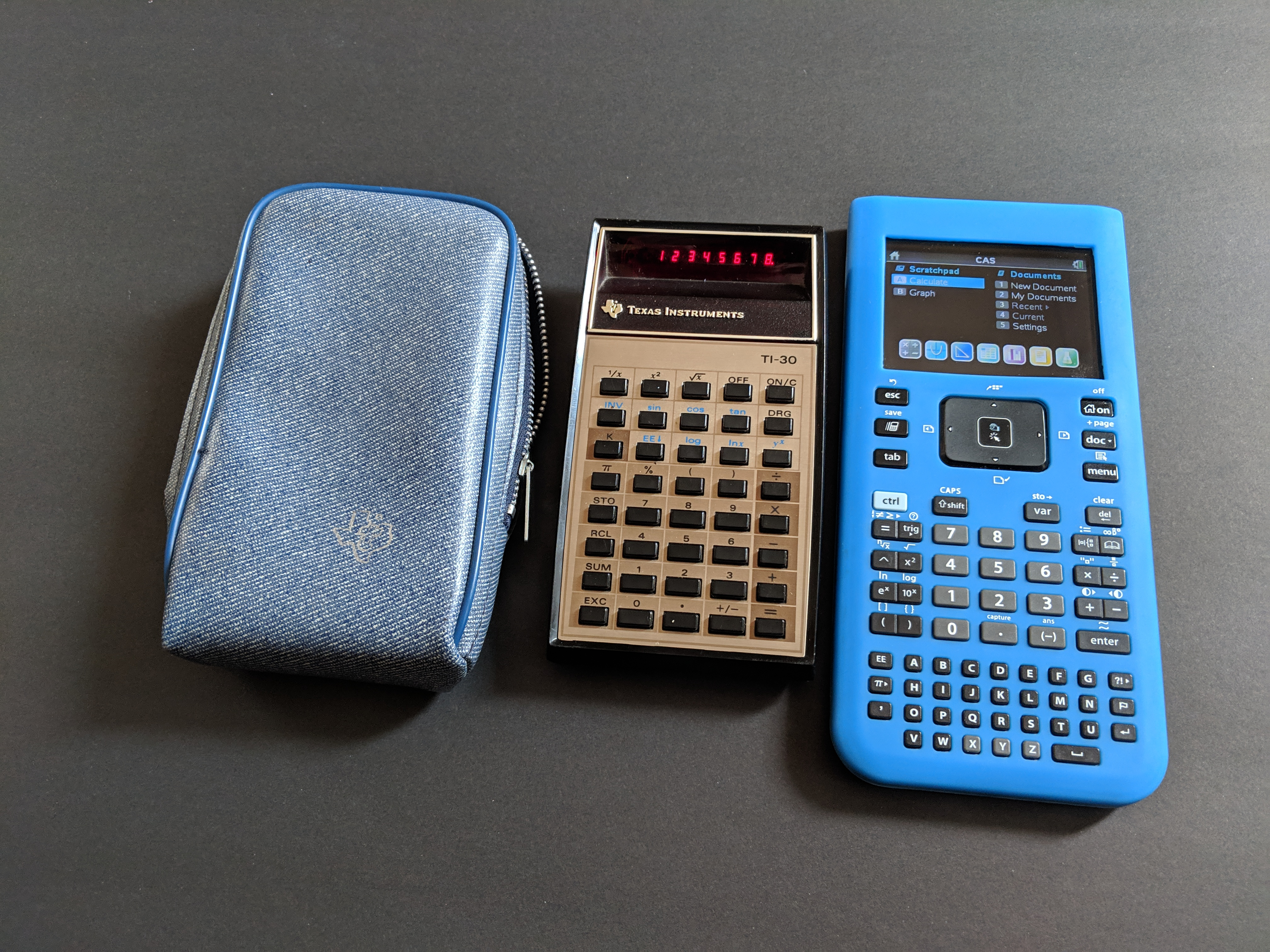
A TI-30 next to its carrying case, with a modern TI nSpire beside it
