= NPartition =

Computer partitioning technology

An nPartition is a hard partition technology in Hewlett Packard Enterprise's (formerly Hewlett-Packard) Virtual Server Environment. nPartitions (or nPar) are electrically isolated from other nPar partitions within the same chassis. Cells (a unit of processors/IO/memory) make up nPar partitions. Being electrically isolated means that if a nPar partition were to fail due to hardware failure, then the other nPar partitions would continue to work. This is contrasted with vPar partitions which exist within nPar partitions in which a failure at the hardware level for a nPar would affect all vPars within that nPar.

The principle of nPartitioning in HP Cell based systems is to combine several cells to increase the computing power of a system by adding more memory/processors/IO. This in contrast to vPartitioning where you slice bigger hardware (nPars) into smaller systems to which you dedicate hardware.

This is valid for all mid-range (rp74/rx7600, rp84/rx8600) and all Superdome servers.

== Advantages ==
When buying a mid-range server from HP with only one cell, the customer might realize over time that his database system requires more computing power, thus by buying an addon cell he can add this cell to his existing nPar (with only one cell) to create a new nPar consisting of two cells, which in a maximum configuration would mean double the number of CPUs and memory.
This can be done on any cell based system, this includes the mid-range family and the Superdome.

If the cells are added as floating cells (no interleaved memory) they can also be warm added and removed from the partition.

== Configurations ==
In a mid-range server you can choose to have 1-4 nPartitions (dependent on model), with all cells populated and 1 nPartition configured a rp84\8600 series would have 16CPU sockets, 64 DIMM slots and 15 I/O slots available. However the customer can configure 4 separate nPartitions (with a rp/rx8000 family and an IO-Extender cabinet) which would each have 4 CPU sockets, 16 DIMM slots and 7 I/O slots available.
Though in a Superdome system, the customer can have 1-16 nPartitions (because the Superdome can fit 16 cellboards), in a fully configured HP Superdome, this would give the customer running 1 nPartition access to 64 CPU sockets, 512 DIMM slots and 192 I/O slots, or any combination of cells and I/O cages.

== Limitations ==
In a rp74/rx7600 family there is no physical limit to how to configure the nPartitions, however CPU/Memory usage may be limited by software like iCAP (HP-UX) or giCAP.

However, on a rp84/rx8600 family server you are limited to a maximum of two nPartitions without buying an IO-Extender cabinet, this in because each partition requires access to I/O slots (or CORE-IO) and the server itself only has two logical I/O domains (on one physical I/O board)

The HP Superdome on the other hand is more flexible, each cell can be connected to an individual I/O cage via a RIO cable, which means in a 1 cabinet Superdome with two I/O cages you are limited to two nPartitions maximum, or if you have a 2 cabinet Superdome and two IO-Extender cabinets you can have up to 16 nPartitions, or any combination therein.
On the Superdome you have four-cell slices called "Quadrants" which means that within this slice you will have better / faster intercommunication between the cells, and the guidelines on nPartitioning should be followed here, this does not apply to mid-range servers since they have a maximum of four cells.

You are not allowed to mix PA-RISC and itanium cells in one nPar, nor are you allowed to mix CPU steppings

== Partitioning software ==
There are several ways to edit the nPartition configuration :

Partitioning from HP System management homepage

- From HP-UX via the par-tools (parmodify, parcreate, etc.)
- From the SMS or a workstation installed with ParCLI tools (same tools that are in HP-UX, just for remote execution from Microsoft Windows).
- Using the HP System Management Homepage for HP-UX, which gives you a graphical user interface for the partitioning.
- Restore a minimal factory configuration from the MP via the "Genesis" command.
