= HP Integral PC =

Portable UNIX workstation computer system

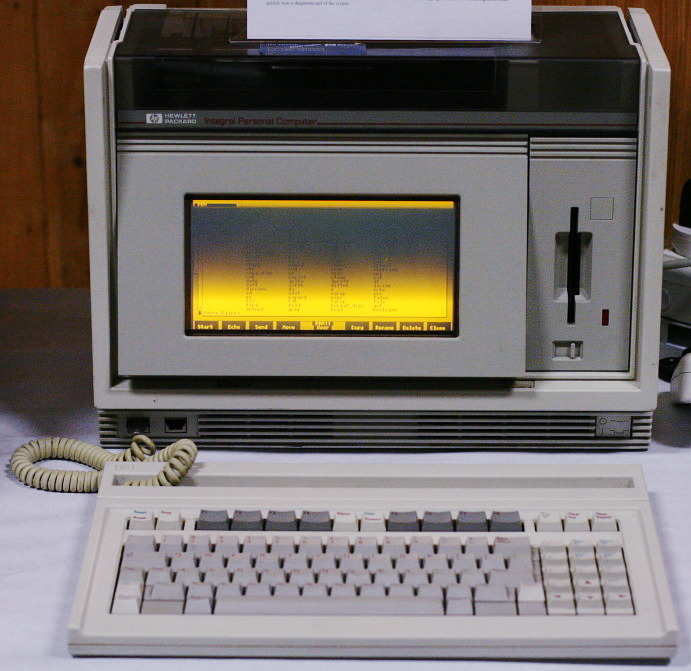
HP Integral PC

The HP Integral PC (or HP 9807A) is a portable UNIX workstation computer system produced by Hewlett-Packard, launched in 1985 at a price of £5450. It utilizes the Motorola 68000 microprocessor (running at 8 MHz) and ran the HP-UX 1.0 operating system.

== Hardware ==
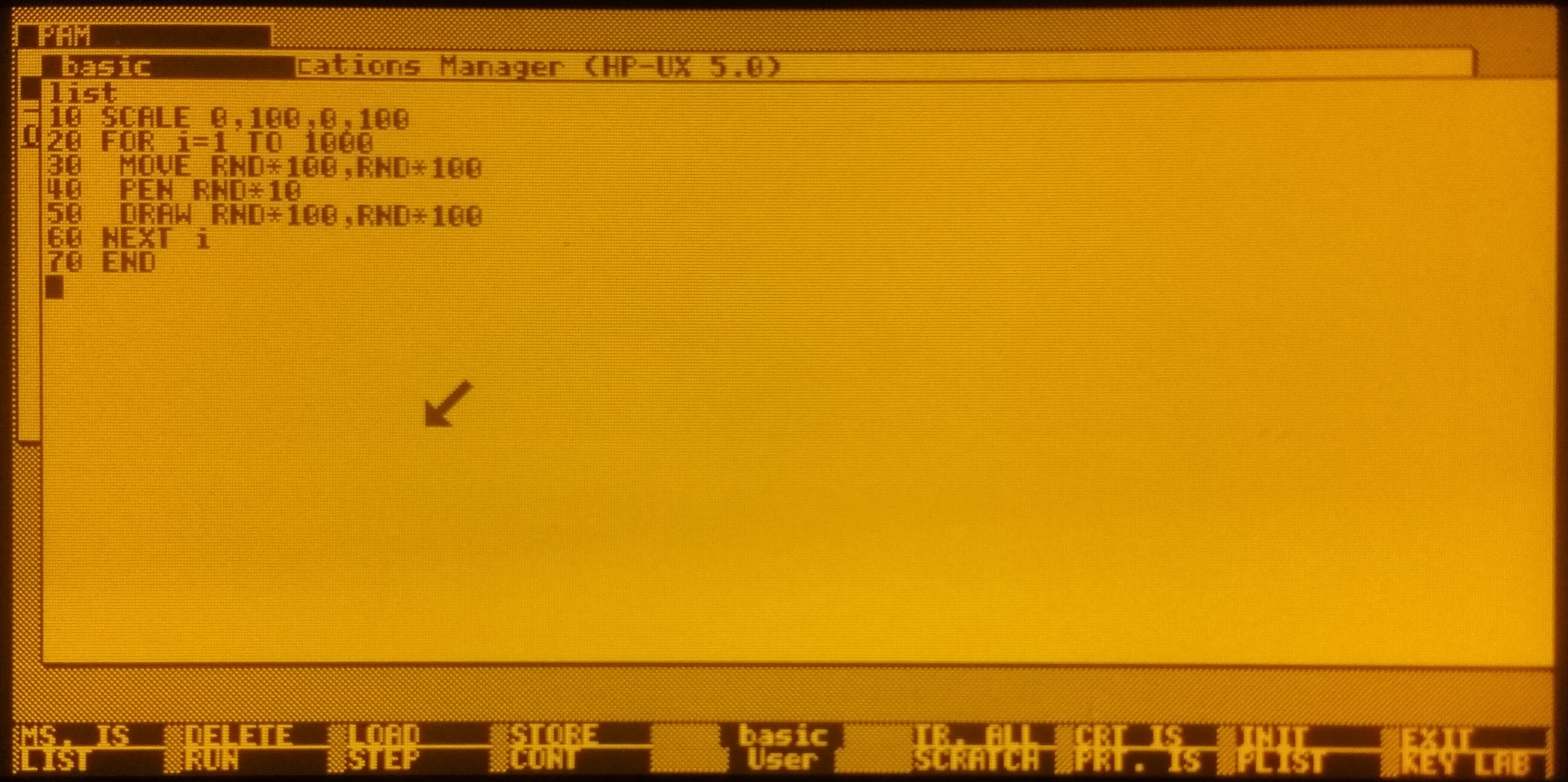
Display of the HP Integral PC

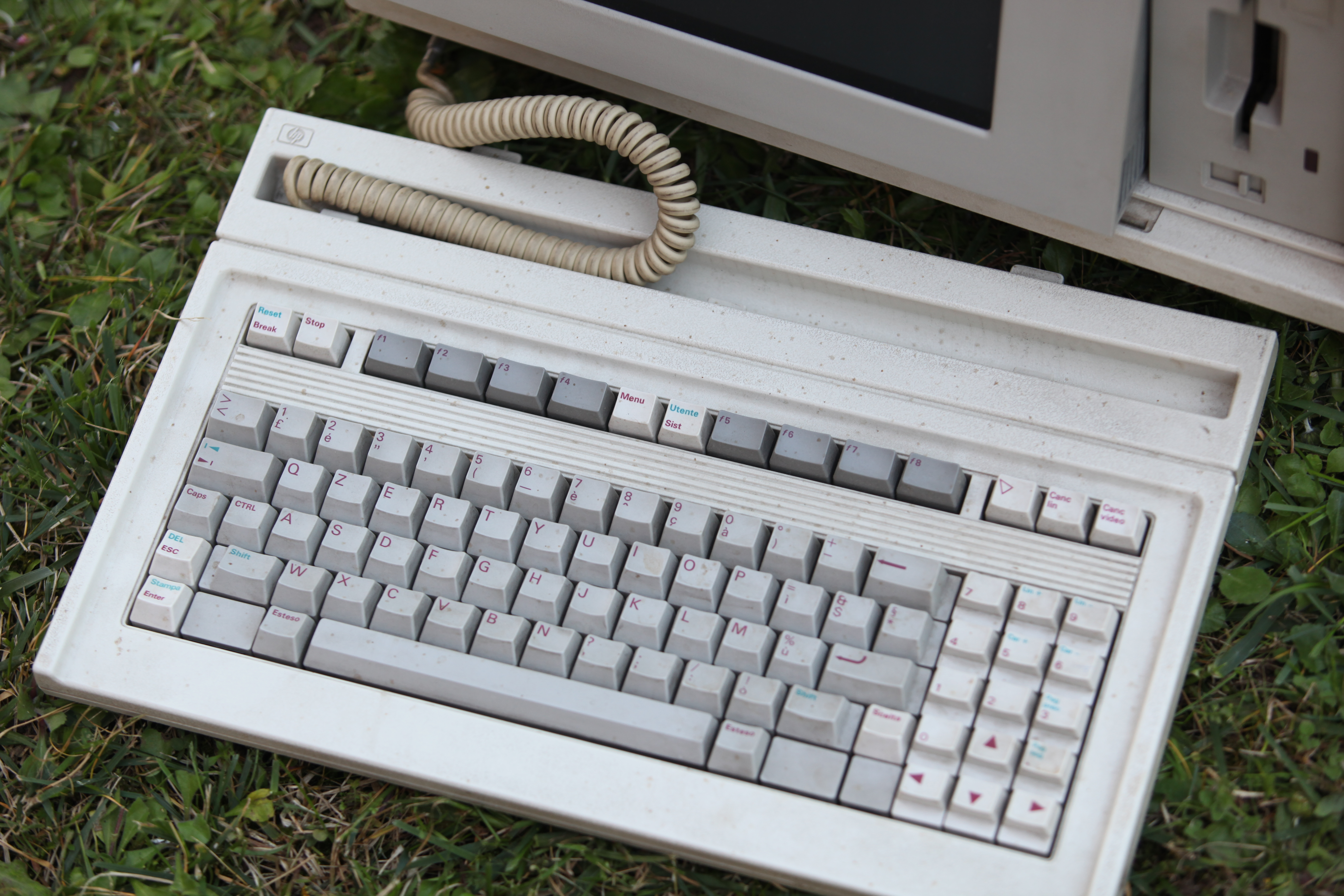
HP Integral PC with QZERTY keyboard layout

The Integral PC is a mains-powered portable computer with a 9-inch amber electroluminescent display with a resolution of 512×255 pixels or 80×25 characters (the 256th line of the display is not used). It also incorporated a 710 kB 3.5" floppy disk drive and an HP ThinkJet ink-jet printer. Standard memory capacity was 256 KB ROM plus 512 KB RAM, expandable to 7.5 MB. Expansion slots and an HP-IB bus were also included. The mechanical design was based on the ideas of the de facto standard HP-85.

Within the Integral PC CPU, RAM, ROM, memory management, I/O buffering, system timing and keyboard interface are integrated on a single logic-board. All peripheral units and the 14 connections are built using independent boards. Each board is smaller than a letter sized sheet. To make it easier to check the boards, each board contains an own timer. The I/O-board (with two connections for optional addons), the keyboard-interface, the "Human Interface Link" HP-HIL and the power supply can be checked and tested independently.

The graphics processor of the Integral PC (GPU) was custom made and could drive an electroluminescence display or nearly every kind of monitor. The processor provides a graphical subsystem which is simple to use to drive a bitmapped display (32 KB display memory). The GPU is able to draw lines, rectangles and alphanumerical characters by hardware. Additionally it provides a hardware cursor and the display-RAM-interface.

The electroluminescence-display was based on thin-film-technique developed by HP and other companies.

== Software ==
The Integral PC is unusual in that the HP-UX operating system kernel resided in the ROM, which also included the HP Windows graphical user interface and the Personal Applications Manager (PAM). HP-UX commands and utilities were supplied separately on floppy disk, with separate disks for standard Unix commands (including the C shell), utilities, diagnostics and system programming resources. There was an add on ROM that provides HP-BASIC. Using the ROM, the Integral PC was ready to run BASIC simply by switching on the system.

== See also ==
- HP Roman-8 (character set)
