= HPE Integrity Servers =

Series of server computers

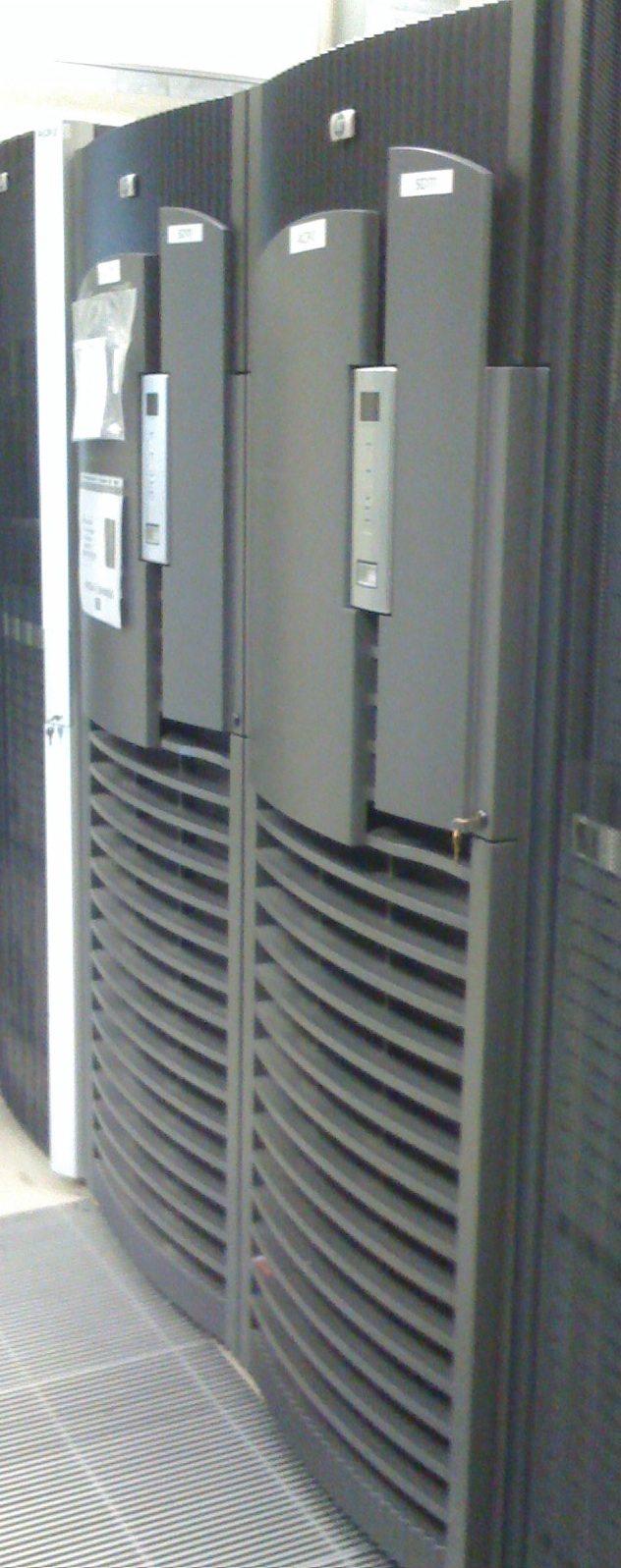
HP Integrity Superdome Itanium, or the "black" one

HPE Integrity Servers is a series of server computers produced from 2003 onwards by Hewlett Packard Enterprise (formerly Hewlett-Packard), and based on the Itanium processor. The Integrity brand name was inherited by HP from Tandem Computers via Compaq.

In 2015, HP released the Superdome X line of Integrity Servers based on the x86 Architecture. It is a 'small' Box holding up to 8 dual Socket Blades and supporting up to 16 processors/240 cores (when populated with Intel Xeon E7-2890 or E7-2880 Processors).

HPE discontinued support for the final Integrity server models at the end of 2025, along with the associated HP-UX operating system.

== General ==
Over the years, Integrity systems have supported Windows Server, HP-UX 11i, OpenVMS, NonStop, Red Hat Enterprise Linux and SUSE Linux Enterprise Server operating systems on Integrity servers. As of 2026, OpenVMS is the only operating system for Integrity servers which still receives active support.

Early Integrity servers were based on two closely related chipsets. The zx1 chipset supported up to 4 CPUs and up to 8 PCI-X busses. They consisted of three distinct application-specific integrated circuits; a memory and I/O controller, a scalable memory adapter and an I/O adapter. The PA-8800 and PA-8900 microprocessors use the same bus as the Itanium 2 processors, allowing HP to also use this chipset for the HP 9000 servers and C8000 workstations.

The memory and I/O controller can be attached directly to up to 12 DDR SDRAM slots. If more slots than this are needed, two scalable memory adapters can be attached instead, allowing up to 48 memory slots. The chipset supports DIMM sizes up to 4 GB, theoretically allowing a machine to support up to 192 GB of RAM, although the largest supported configuration was 128 GB.

The sx1000 chipset supported up to 64 CPUs and up to 192 PCI-X buses. The successor chipsets were the zx2 and sx2000 respectively.

== Entry-level servers ==
=== rx1600 series ===
The 1U rx1600 server is based on the zx1 chipset and has support for one or two 1 GHz Deerfield Itanium 2 CPUs. The 1U rx1620 server is based on the zx1 chipset and has support for one or two 1.3/1.6 GHz Fanwood Itanium 2 CPUs.

Common for the series is:

- Memory: Up to 8 DIMMs
- Storage: Dual-channel Ultra-320 SCSI controller with support for two hot-swappable Ultra 320 drives
  - One external Ultra 320 SCSI port
- Network:10/100/1000BaseTX LAN port
  - An additional 10/100BaseTX LAN port
- General-purpose RS-232 serial port
- Possibility for redundant power supplies
- Two USB ports
- Two PCI-X slots

Optional features are:

- SCSI RAID controller
- Management processor card (required for support of Windows Server 2003)
- CD/DVD-ROM (required for installation of Windows Server 2003 and OpenVMS)

The series support five operating systems:

- HP-UX 11i v2 or later
- OpenVMS for Itanium
- Windows Server 2003 for Itanium
- Windows Server 2008 for Itanium
- Linux with kernel that supports Itanium

=== rx2600 series ===
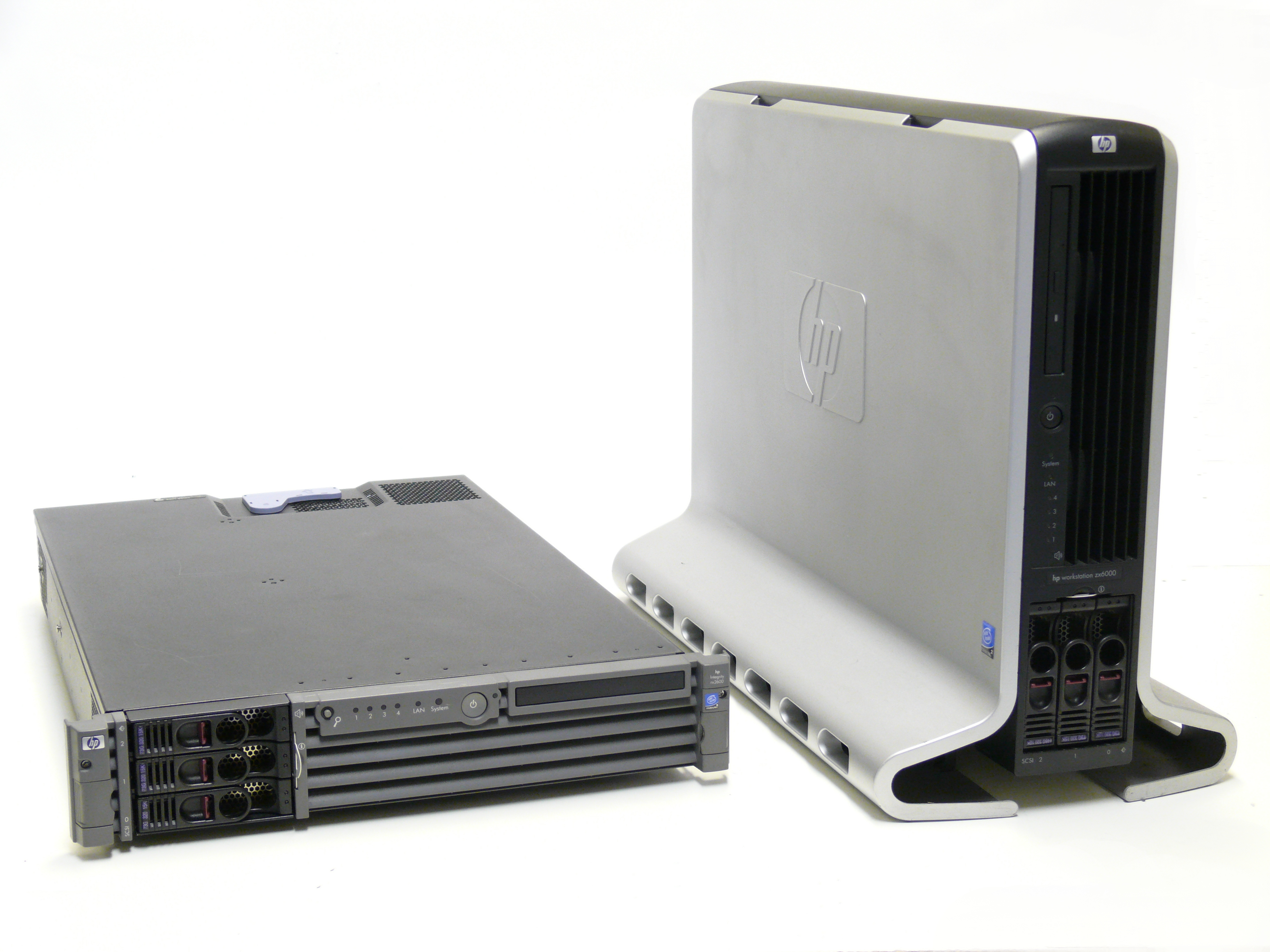
Integrity rx2600 rack-mountable server and zx6000 workstation (based on a desktop RX2600 server)

The 2U rx2600 server is based on the zx1 chipset and has support for one or two 1.0/1.4 GHz Deerfield/Madison, 1.3 GHz Madison or 1.5 GHz Madison CPUs. The 2U rx2620 server is based on the zx1 chipset and has support for one or two 1.6 GHz Fanwood/Madison or 1.4/1.6 GHz Montecito CPUs. The 2U rx2660 server is based on the zx2 chipset and has support for one or two 1.6 GHz Montvale or 1.42/1.66 GHz Montvale CPUs.

Common for the series is:

- Memory: Up to 12 DIMMs (8 DIMMs for the rx2660)
- Storage: Dual channel Ultra 320 SCSI controller with support for two internal hard drives
  - Support for three hot-swappable Ultra 320 drives
  - One external Ultra 320 SCSI port
- Network: 10/100/1000BaseTX LAN port
- Two general-purpose RS-232 serial ports
- Possibility for redundant power supplies
- Two USB ports
- Four PCI-X slots

Optional features are:

- SCSI RAID controller
- Management processor card (required for support of Windows Server 2003)
- CD/DVD-ROM (Required for installation of Windows Server 2003 and OpenVMS)

The series support four operating systems:

- HP-UX 11i v2 or later
- OpenVMS for Itanium
- Windows Server 2003 for Itanium
- Linux with kernel that supports Itanium

=== rx2800 series ===
The 2U rx2800 i2 server used the Intel Itanium 9300 series chipset with 8, 4 or 2 processor cores available. Among features common for the series:

- Memory: Up to 24 DIMMs
- Storage: HP p410i 3 Gb SAS Controller
  - Support for 8 hot-plug Serial Attached SCSI (SAS) small form factor (SFF) 2.5 inch drives
- Network: Quad port 10/100/1000 Base TX LAN
- Six expansion slots

The series supports three operating systems: HP-UX 11i v3, OpenVMS v 8.4 for Itanium, and Windows Server for Itanium.

=== rx3600 ===
The 4U rx3600 is based on the zx2 chipset and has two CPU sockets which support Montecito or Montvale processors. It supports up to 96 GB of main memory, using 24 four-gigabyte DIMMs.

Standard features include:

- Memory: Up to 24 ECC memory PC2 4200 DDR2 DIMMs (with two optional 12-slot memory carrier boards)
- Storage: Eight 2.5" Serial Attached SCSI (SAS) disk-drive slots
  - 8-port SAS host bus adapter, supporting two RAID 1 volumes and a hot spare
- Network: Dual-port 10/100/1000Base TX LAN
- Integrated HPE Integrated Lights-Out2 (iLO) management processor
- Choice of I/O backplane: PCI-X with 8 available PCI-X slots, or the PCI Express I/O backplane, containing 4 x8 PCI Express slots, and 4 PCI-X slots. The system also has 2 reserved PCI-X slots, one of which is used for a PCI-X dual-port 10/100/1000Base TX LAN card, and the other is reserved for an optional internal Smart Array RAID card.
- N+1 hot-swappable fans
- Hot-swappable power supply
- Hot-swappable PCI-X I/O cards

Optional features:

- up to 8 SAS disk drives, with support for up to 72 GB 15K-RPM or 146 GB 10K-RPM disks.
- Redundant hot-swappable power supply
- 8-port HP Smart Array P400 or P600, or 16-port P800 SAS RAID controllers available for internal disks, supporting RAID 1/5/6 and hot spare disks.

=== rx4600 series ===
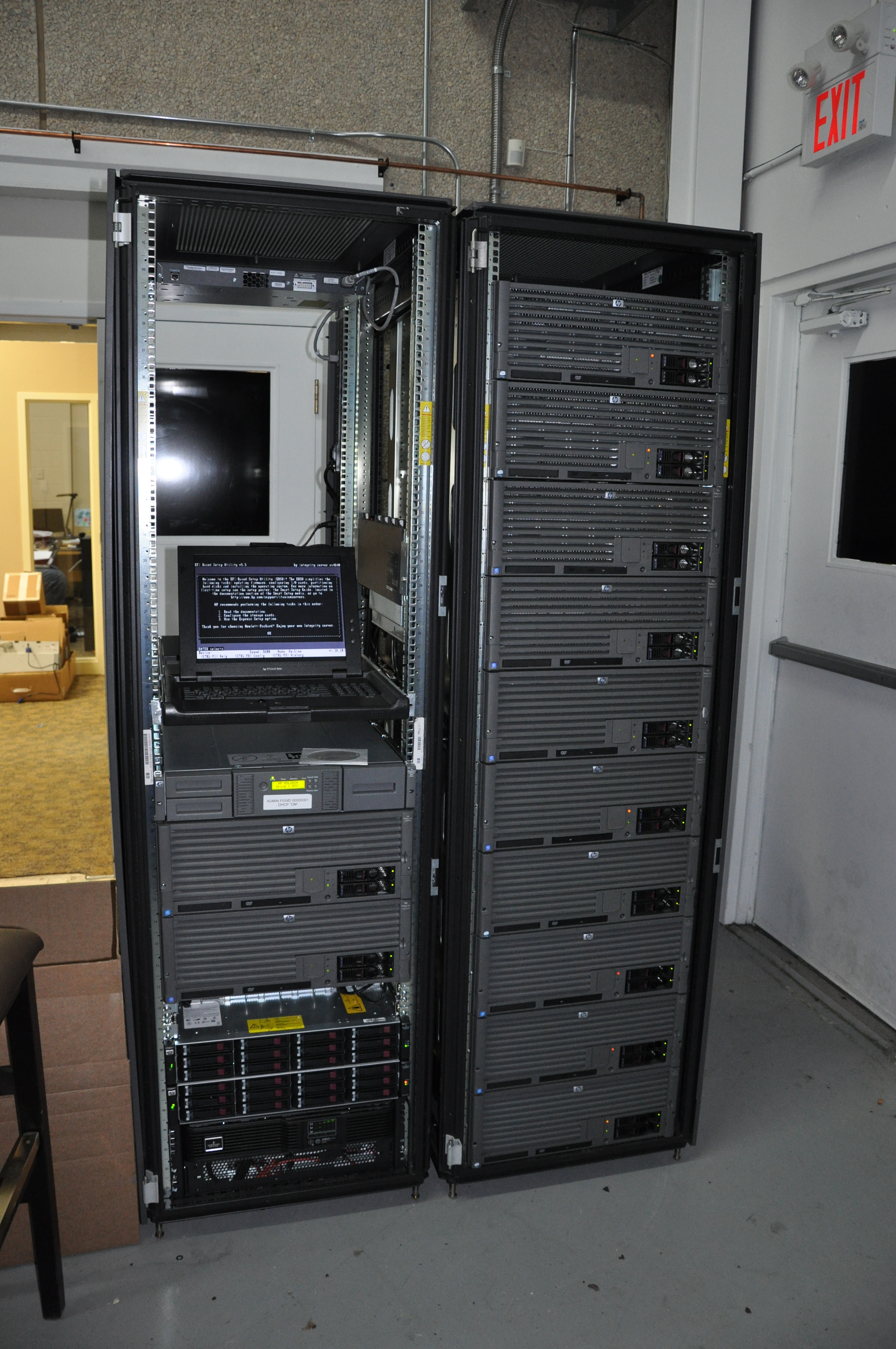
Rack with Integrity rx4640 servers

The 7U rx4610 utilizes Itanium 1 CPUs with support for up to four single-core CPUs, 64GB RAM and 10 PCI 64-bit slots. The 4U rx4640 utilizes Itanium 2 CPUs with support for up to four dual-core CPUs, 128 GB RAM and 6 PCI-X slots.

Both of these models come with integrated USB and video as default, which enables support for Microsoft Windows operating systems. The rx4640 is architecturally the same box as the rp4440, and can be changed from PA-RISC to Itanium 2 support with the flip of a switch.

=== rx5670 ===
The discontinued 7U rx5670 server has four CPU sockets which support McKinley and Madison processors. It is zx1-based and can have up to 48 DIMM slots, supporting 256 MB to 2 GB DIMMs which must be loaded in matched sets of four (quads). It has 9 PCI-X slots and 1 PCI slot available.

=== rx6600 ===
The 7U rx6600 is based on the zx2 chipset and has four CPU sockets that support Montecito and Montvale CPUs. It supports 384 GB memory using 48 eight-gigabyte DIMMs.

Standard features include:

- Memory: Up to 48 ECC memory PC2 4200 DDR2 DIMMs (with the 48-slot memory board)
- Storage: Sixteen 2.5" SAS disk drive slots
  - 8-port SAS host bus adapter, supporting two RAID 1 volumes and a hot spare
- Network: Dual-port 10/100/1000Base TX LAN
- Integrated iLO2 management processor
- Choice of I/O backplane: PCI-X with 8 available PCI-X slots, or the PCI Express I/O backplane, containing 4 x8 PCI Express slots, and 4 PCI-X slots. The system also has 2 reserved PCI-X slots, one of which is used for a PCI-X dual-port 10/100/1000Base TX LAN card, and the other is reserved for an optional internal Smart Array RAID card.
- N+1 hot-swappable fans
- Hot-swappable power supply
- Hot swappable PCI-X I/O cards

Optional features:

- Up to 16 SAS disk drives, with support for 72 GB 15K-RPM / 146 GB 10K-RPM or 300 GB 10K-RPM disks
- Redundant hot swappable power supply
- 8-port HP Smart Array P400 or P600, or 16-port P800 SAS RAID controllers available for internal disks, supporting RAID 1/5/6 and hot-spare disks

== Mid-range servers ==
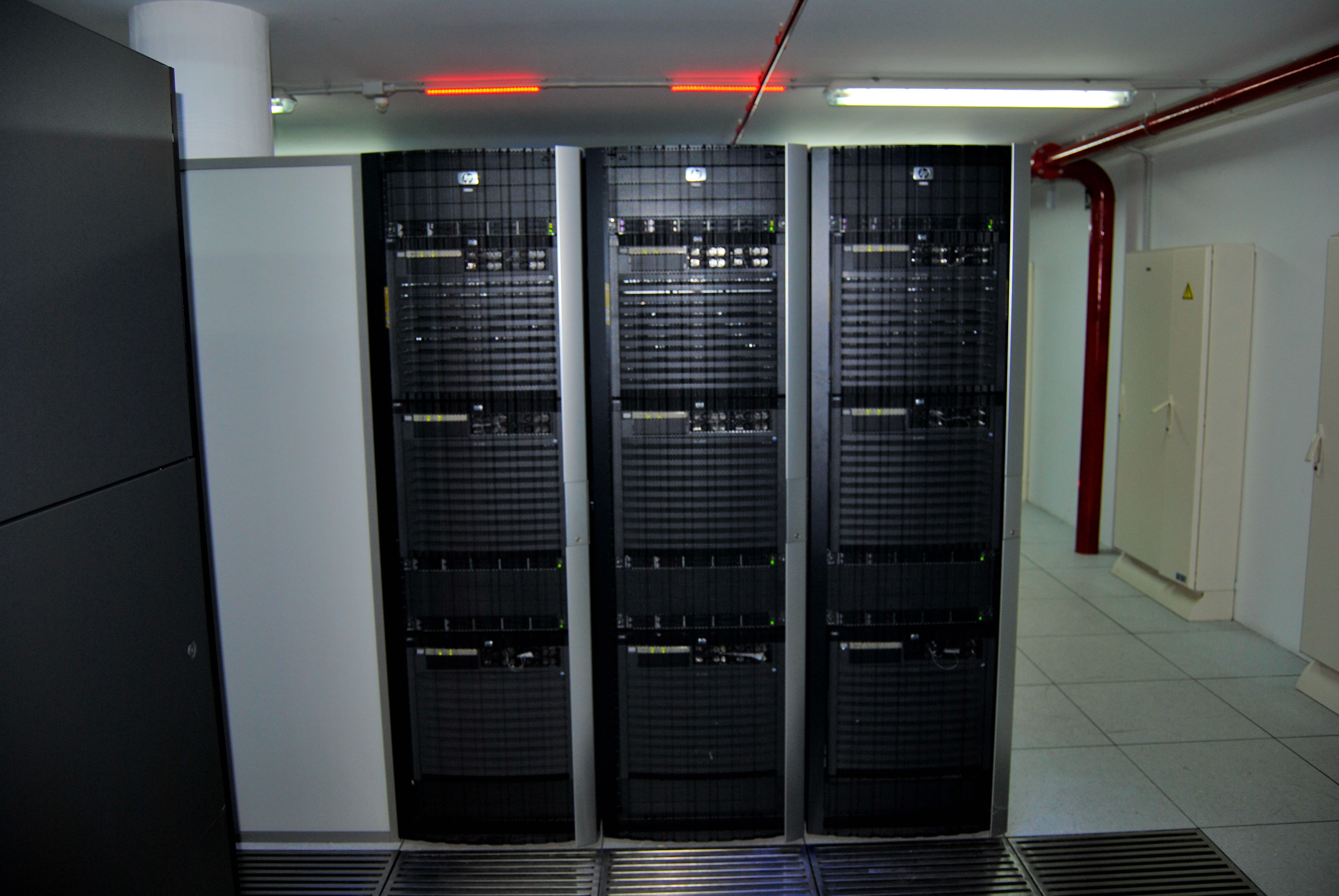
HP Integrity rx7640 servers

HP's mid-range and high-end (Superdome) servers are based on cell boards, sometimes called cells, which contain the chipset, Processors, memory, and I/O bus. This design allows the servers to be divided into hardware partitions, or groups of cell boards. Each partition is able to perform as if it were a separate server.

=== rx7600 series ===
The 10U rx7620 is based on the SX1000 chipset which supports both PA-RISC and Itanium 2 CPUs. The 10U rx7640 is based on the SX2000 chipset which supports both PA-RISC and Itanium 2 CPUs.

- Maximum of 2 cell boards
- 4 CPU sockets per cell board
- 16 DIMM slots per cell board
- Maximum of 4 SCSI disks and 2 tape and/or CD/DVD-ROM internally (half to each cell board)
- 7 hot-pluggable I/O slots per cell board plus 1 core I/O slot per cell board for SX1000

The rx7600 series are the smallest cell-based servers from HP. Just like the bigger rx8600 (see below) and the HP Superdome (see below), these servers can be partitioned, either as one big partition (two cells in one partition) or as two independent cells.

=== rx8600 series ===
The 17U rx8620 is based on the SX1000 chipset which supports both PA-RISC and Itanium 2 CPUs. The 17U rx8640 is based on the SX2000 chipset which supports both PA-RISC and Itanium 2 CPUs.

- The rx8620 was announced in 2003, along with the rx4640 and rx7620
- Maximum of four cell boards
- Four CPU sockets per cell board
- 16 DIMM slots per cell board
- Maximum of four SCSI disks and two tape and/or CD/DVD-ROM internally (half to cell board 0, half to cell board 1)
- Eight hot-pluggable I/O-slots per cell board and 1 core I/O slot per cell board for SX1000

Just like the smaller rx7600 (see above) and the HP Superdome (see below), the rx8600 can be partitioned using any combination of the four available cell boards (minimum of one, maximum of four separated partitions).

The maximum number of partitions is four when used with an I/O-expander unit. Because each partition requires an available I/O slot, and the rx8600 series' integrated I/O-chassis statically maps its two I/O slots to cell board 0 and 1, an rx8600 series system is limited to two partitions unless an IOX is installed.

Cells can be freely moved from a rx7600 series to a rx8600 series as long as the chipset is the same on the cells, and the firmware is compatible.

== High-end servers ==
=== Superdome ===
The Superdome server is available in several models, including the SD-16, SD-32, and SD-64. HP announced Superdome 2 in April 2010, offering resiliency improvements, a modular, bladed design, common components and crossbar fabric that routes transactions to the optimal pathway between blades and I/O. Superdome 2 addresses requirements for high-performance computing by providing flexible scalability and fault tolerance necessary for mission-critical workloads.

In November 2011 HP announced Project Odyssey, a development roadmap to unify server architectures on a single platform. The roadmap includes blades with Intel Xeon processors for the HP Superdome 2 enclosure (code-named DragonHawk) and the scalable c-Class blade enclosures (code-named HydraLynx), while supporting Windows and Linux environments with features from HP-UX within the next two years.
