= HP Serviceguard =

High-availability cluster software

HP Serviceguard, formerly known as MC/ServiceGuard, is a high-availability cluster software produced by HP that runs on HP-UX and Linux.

Serviceguard has existed since 1990, which HP claims to have been the first high availability solution for UNIX. A Linux port called SG/LX has existed since 1999, but was briefly suspended and then reintroduced in June 2012.
