= HP-UX =

Operating system

- Screenshot and CDE graphical interface of HP-UX version 11iv3
- Developer: Hewlett Packard Enterprise
- Written in: C
- OS family: Unix (System V)
- Working state: Discontinued
- Source model: Closed source
- Initial release: 1982; 44 years ago
- Latest release: 2025.11iv3 / May 22, 2025; 17 months ago
- Marketing target: Server
- Available in: English
- Package manager: Software Distributor
- Supported platforms: Motorola 68k, FOCUS, PA-RISC, IA-64
- Kernel type: Monolithic with dynamically loadable modules
- Userland: POSIX / SUS
- Default user interface: KDE Plasma, GNOME and CDE
- License: Proprietary
- Official website: Integrity Servers with HP-UX for Mission Critical UNIX at the Wayback Machine (archived 2023-05-15)

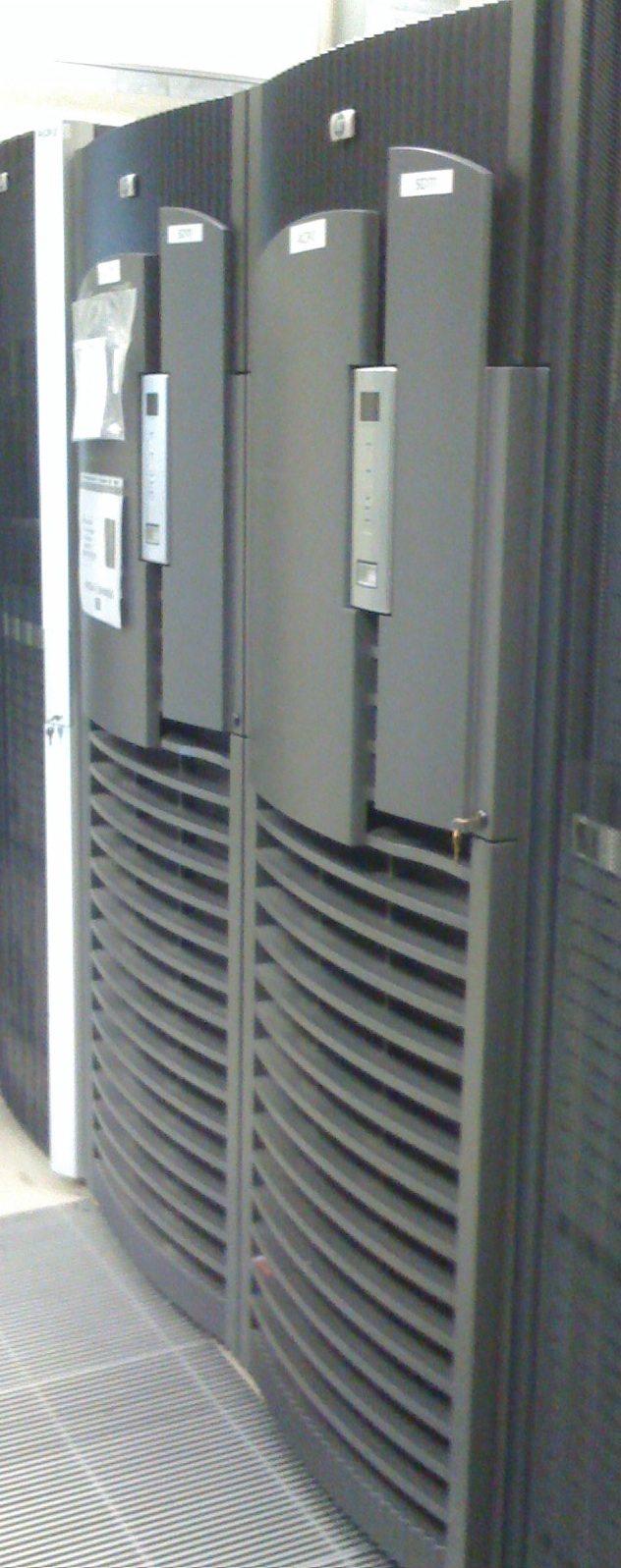
HPE Superdome running HP-UX 11.23 OS

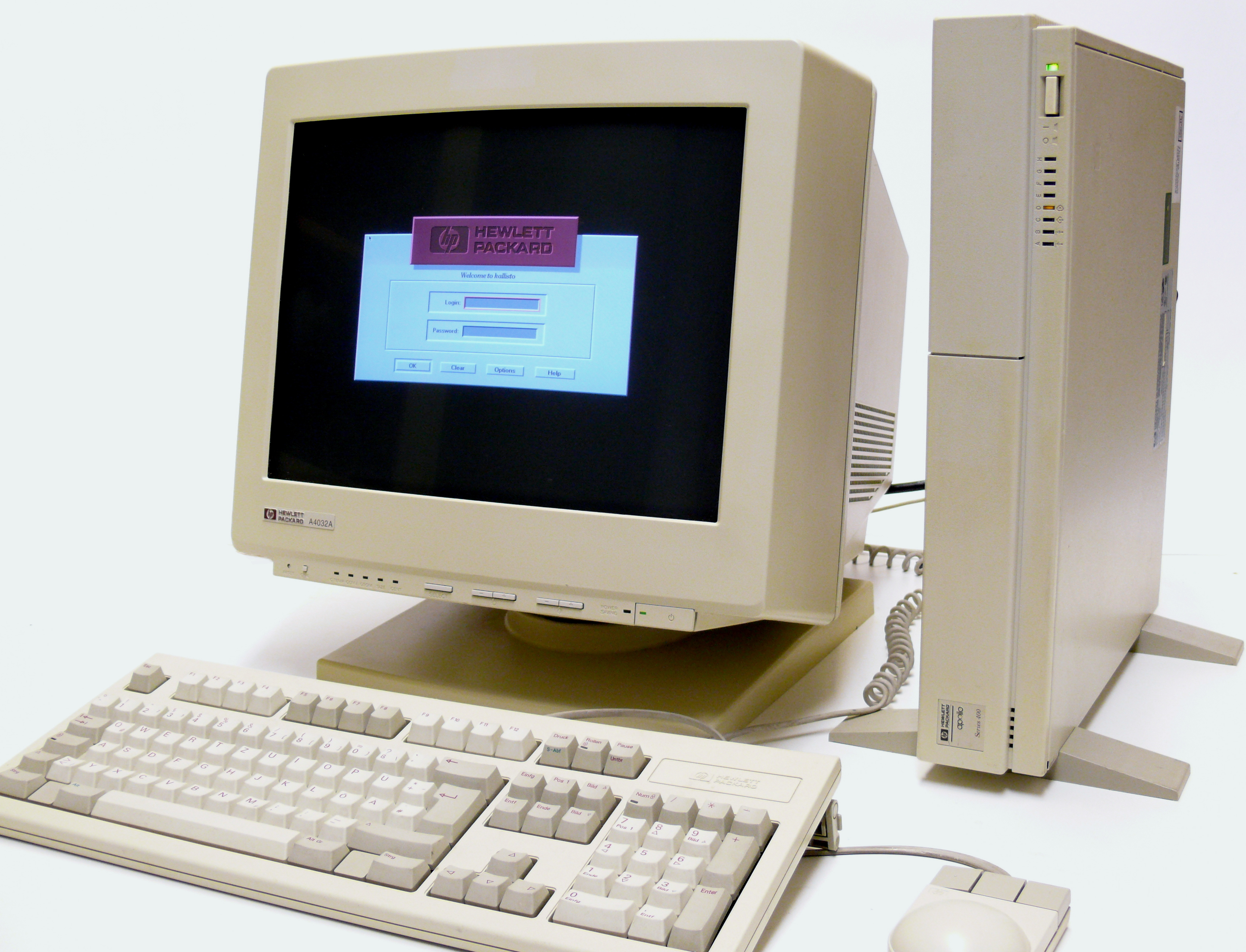
HP 9000/425 workstation running HP-UX 9 with HP-VUE

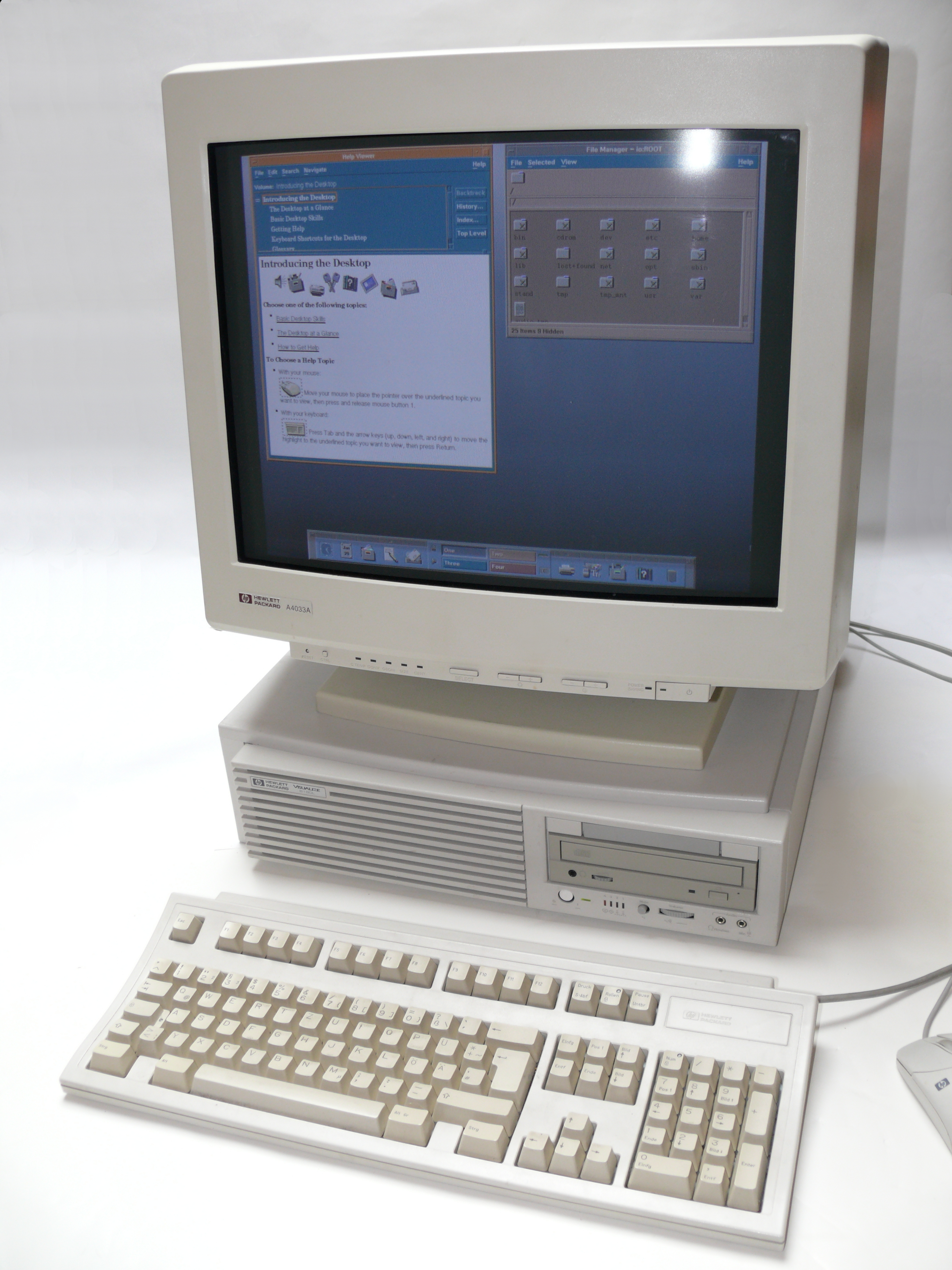
The HP 9000-B180L workstation running HP-UX 10.20 with CDE

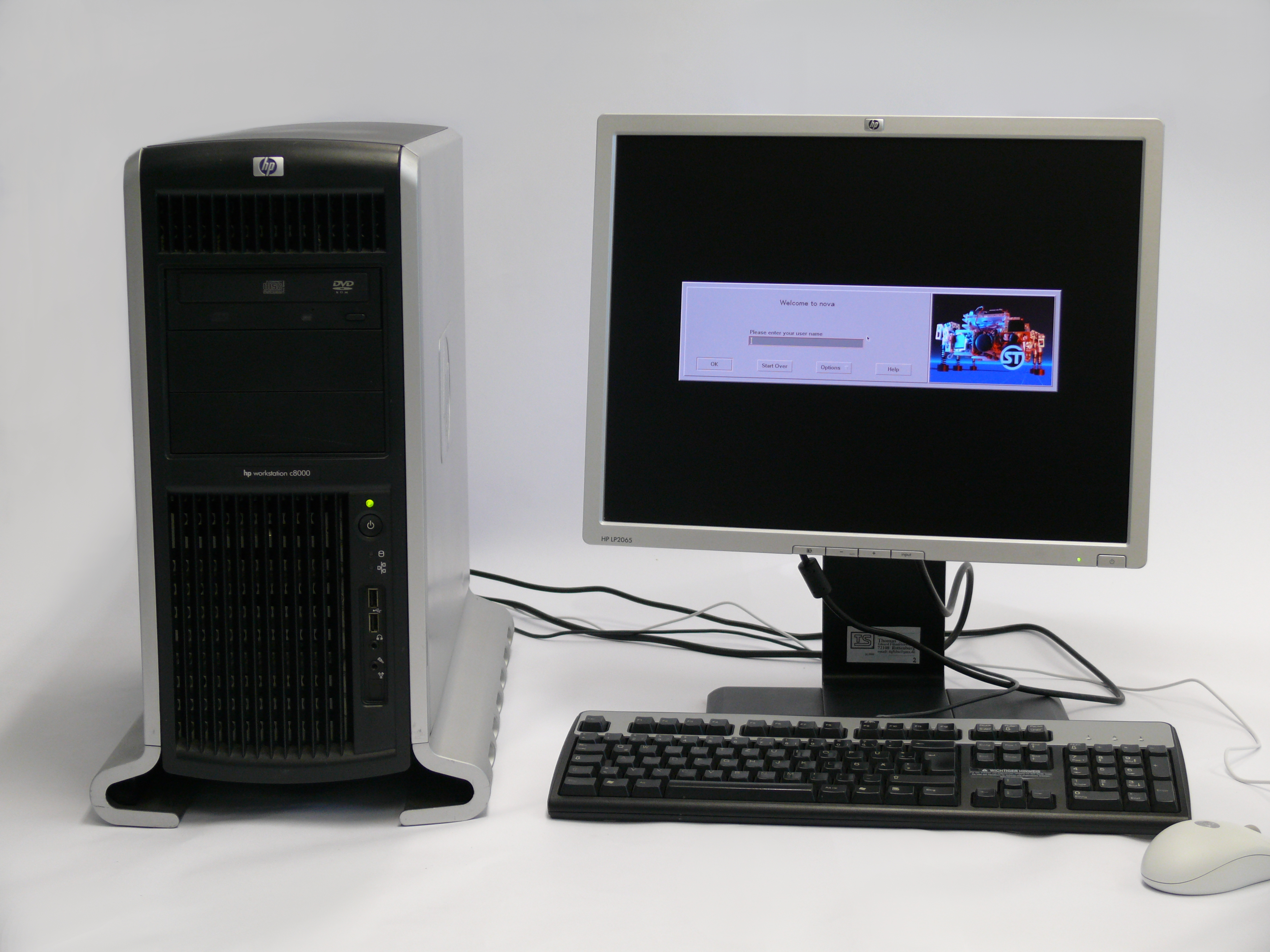
HP C8000 workstation running HP-UX 11i

HP-UX (from "Hewlett Packard Unix") is a discontinued proprietary implementation of the Unix operating system developed by Hewlett Packard Enterprise, now out of standard support (Mature Support on HPE Integrity without Sustaining Engineering through at least 2028); the final versions support HPE Integrity Servers, based on Intel's Itanium architecture. It is based on Unix System V (initially System III) and first released in 1984.

Earlier versions of HP-UX supported the HP Integral PC and HP 9000 Series 200, 300, and 400 computer systems based on the Motorola 68000 series of processors, the HP 9000 Series 500 computers based on HP's proprietary FOCUS architecture, and later HP 9000 Series models based on HP's PA-RISC instruction set architecture. HP-UX was the first Unix to offer access-control lists for file access permissions as an alternative to the standard Unix permissions system. HP-UX was also among the first Unix systems to include a built-in logical volume manager.

Following the discontinuation of Itanium processors, support for HP-UX ended on December 31, 2025. HP-UX 11i (the latest then-supported version) is certified to The Open Group's older UNIX 03 standard. Previous releases were certified to the UNIX 95 standard.

== Characteristics ==
HP-UX 11i offers a common shared disks for its clustered file system. HP Serviceguard is the cluster solution for HP-UX. HP Global Workload Management adjusts workloads to optimize performance, and integrates with Instant Capacity on Demand so installed resources can be paid for in 30-minute increments as needed for peak workload demands.

HP-UX offers operating system-level virtualization features such as hardware partitions, isolated OS virtual partitions on cell-based servers, and HP Integrity Virtual Machines (HPVM) on all Integrity servers. HPVM supports guests running on HP-UX 11i v3 hosts – guests can run Linux, Windows Server, OpenVMS or HP-UX. HP supports online VM guest migration, where encryption can secure the guest contents during migration.

HP-UX 11i v3 scales as follows (on a SuperDome 2 with 32 Intel Itanium 9560 processors):

- 256 processor cores
- 8 TB main memory
- 32 TB maximum file system
- 16 TB maximum file size
- 128 million ZB—16 million logical units each up to 8 ZB.

== Security ==
The 11i v2 release introduced kernel-based intrusion detection, strong random number generation, stack buffer overflow protection, security partitioning, role-based access management, and various open-source security tools.

HP classifies the operating system's security features into three categories: data, system and identity:

Category	Security products
Data	Encrypted Volumes and File Systems, Trusted Computing, whitelisting, containers, IPsec
System	Software Assistant, Bastille, Auditing System, IPFilter, Host IDS, Standard Mode Security Extensions,
Identity	RBAC, PAM-Kerberos, AAA server, Kerberos server

=== Context dependent files ===
Release 6.x (together with 3.x) introduced the context dependent files (CDF) feature, a method of allowing a fileserver to serve different configurations and binaries (and even architectures) to different client machines in a heterogeneous environment. A directory containing such files had its suid bit set and was made hidden from both ordinary and root processes under normal use. Such a scheme was sometimes exploited by intruders to hide malicious programs or data. CDFs and the CDF filesystem were dropped with release 10.0.

== Supported hardware platforms ==
HP-UX operating systems supports a variety of PA-RISC systems. The 11.0 added support for Integrity-based servers for the transition from PA-RISC to Itanium. HP-UX 11i v1.5 is the first version that supported Itanium. On the introduction of HP-UX 11i v2 the operating system supported both of these architectures.

=== BL series ===
HP-UX 11i supports HPE Integrity Servers of HP BL server blade family. These servers use the Intel Itanium architecture.

=== CX series ===
HP-UX 11i v2 and 11i v3 support HP's CX series servers. CX stands for carrier grade and is used mainly for telco industry with -48V DC support and is NEBS certified. Both of these systems contain Itanium Mad6M processors and are discontinued.

=== RX series ===
HP-UX supports HP's RX series of servers.

== Release history ==
Prior to the release of HP-UX version 11.11, HP used a decimal version numbering scheme with the first number giving the major release and the number following the decimal showing the minor release. With 11.11, HP made a marketing decision to name their releases 11i followed by a v(decimal-number) for the version. The i was intended to indicate the OS is Internet-enabled, but the effective result was a dual version-numbering scheme.

=== Version history ===
Version	Release date	End-of-life date	Hardware
11i v1 (B.11.11)	2000-12-01	2015-12-31	HP 9000
11i v1.6 (B.11.22)	2002-06-02	2015-12-31	Integrity
11i v2 (B.11.23)	2003-10-01	2015-12-31	HP 9000 and Integrity
11i v3 (B.11.31)	2007-02-01	2021-03-31	HP 9000
11i v3 (B.11.31)	2007-02-01	2025-12-31	Integrity
Legend: Unsupported

=== Versions ===
HP-UX 11 logo; starting in 2000, the logo and version number were appended with an i to denote an Internet-enabled OS

Logo used from 2010 to 2012

1.0 (1982)
First release for HP 9000 Series 500. HP-UX for Series 500 was substantially different from HP-UX for any other HP machines, as it was layered atop a Series 500 specific operating system called SUNOS (unrelated to Sun Microsystems' SunOS).
1.0 (1984)
AT&T System III based. Support for the HP Integral PC (HP 9807A). The kernel runs from ROM; other commands are disk based.
2.0 (1984)
First release for HP's early Motorola 68000-based workstations (HP 9816U, HP 9826U, HP 9836U)
5.0 (1985)
AT&T System V based. Distinct versions were available for the Integral PC, the Series 200/300 and the Series 500. Introduced the proprietary Starbase graphics API for the Series 200, 300 and 500. The Series 300 5.x releases included a proprietary windowing system built on top of Starbase named HP Windows/9000, which was also available as an optional extra for Series 500 hardware.
3.x (1988)
HP 9000 Series 600/800 only. Note: 2.x/3.x (for Series 600/800) were developed in parallel with 5.x/6.x (for Series 200/300/400), so, for example, 3.x was really contemporary with 6.x. The two lines were united at HP-UX 7.x.
6.x (1988)
Support for HP 9000 Series 300 only. Introduced sockets from 4.3BSD. This version (together with 3.x) also introduced the above-discussed context dependent files (CDF), which were removed in release 10 because of their security risks. The 6.2 release added X11, superseding HP Windows/9000 and X10. 6.5 allowed Starbase programs to run alongside X11 programs.
7.x (1990)
Support for HP 9000 Series 300/400, 600/700 (in 7.03) /800 HP systems. Provided OSF/Motif. Final version to include the HP Windows/9000 windowing system.
8.x (January 1991)
Support for HP 9000 Series 300/400 600/700/800 systems. Shared libraries introduced.

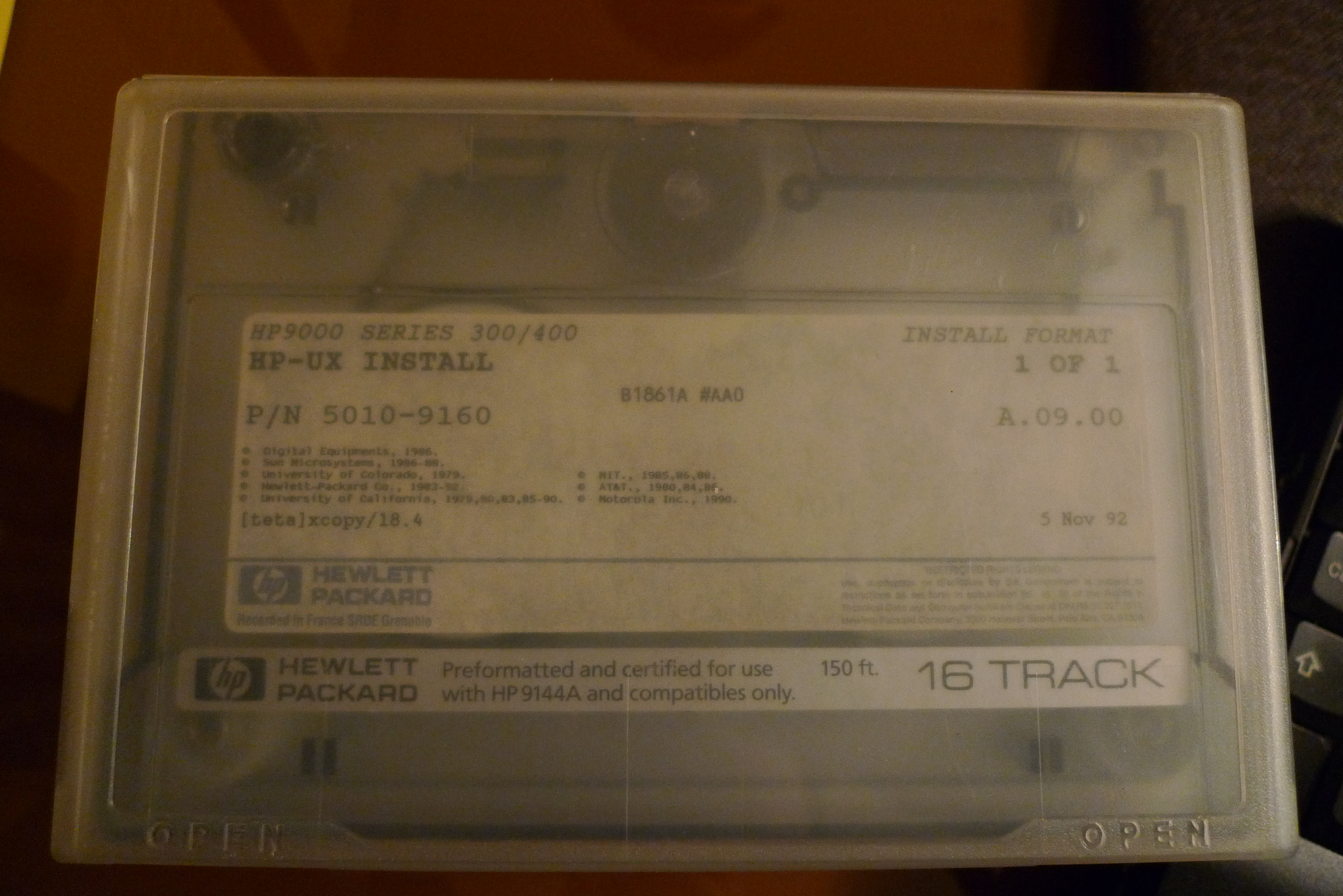
HP-UX 9.0 installation software on QIC cartridge, 1992

9.x (July 1992)
9.00, 9.02, 9.04 (Series 600/800), 9.01, 9.03, 9.05, 9.07 (Series 300/400/700), 9.08, 9.09, 9.09+ (Series 700 only), 9.10 (Series 300/400 only). These provided support for the HP 9000 Series 300, 700 and 800 systems. Introduced System Administration Manager (SAM). The Logical Volume Manager (LVM) was presented in 9.00 for the Series 800. Adopted the Visual User Environment desktop.
10.0 (1995)
This major release saw a convergence of the operating system between the HP 9000 Series 700 (workstation) and Series 800 (server) systems, dropping support for previous lines. There was also a significant change in the layout in the system files and directories, based on the AT&T UNIX System V Release 4 standard. Applications were removed from /usr and moved under /opt; startup configuration files were placed under /etc/rc.config.d; users were moved to /home from /users. Software for HP-UX was now packaged, shipped, installed, and removed via the Software Distributor (SD) tools. LVM was also made available for Series 700.
10.10 (1996)
Introduced the Common Desktop Environment. UNIX95 compliance.
10.20 (1996)
This release included support for 64-bit PA-RISC 2.0 processors. Pluggable Authentication Modules (PAM) were introduced for use within CDE. The root file system could be configured to use the Veritas File System (VxFS). For legacy as well as technical reasons, the file system used for the boot kernel remained Hi Performance FileSystem (HFS, a variant of UFS) until version 11.23. 10.20 also supported 32-bit user and group identifiers. The prior limit was 60,000, or 16-bit. This and earlier releases of HP-UX are now effectively obsolete, and support by HP ended on June 30, 2003.
10.24
This is a Virtual Vault release of HP-UX, providing enhanced security features. Virtual Vault is a compartmentalised operating system in which each file is assigned a compartment and processes only have access to files in the appropriate compartment and unlike most other UNIX systems the superuser (or root) does not have complete access to the system without following correct procedures.
10.30 (1997)
This was primarily a developer release with various incremental enhancements. It provided the first support for kernel threads, with a 1:1 thread model (each user thread is bound to one kernel thread).
11.00 (1997)
The first HP-UX release to also support 64-bit addressing. It could still run 32-bit applications on a 64-bit system. It supported symmetric multiprocessing, Fibre Channel, and NFS PV3. It also included tools and documentation to convert 32-bit code to 64-bit.
11.04
Virtual Vault release.
11.10
This was a limited release to support the HP 9000 V2500 SCA (Scalable Computing Architecture) and V2600 SCA servers. It also added JFS 3.3, AutoFS, a new ftpd, and support for up to 128 CPUs. It was not available separately.
11.11 (2000) – 11i v1
This release of HP-UX introduced the concept of Operating Environments. It was released in December 2000. These are bundled groups of layered applications intended for use with a general category of usage. The available types were the Mission Critical, Enterprise, Internet, Technical Computing, and Minimal Technical OEs. (The last two were intended for HP 9000 workstations.) The main enhancements with this release were support for hard partitions, Gigabit Ethernet, NFS over TCP/IP, loadable kernel modules, dynamic kernel tunable parameters, kernel event Notifications, and protected stacks.
11.20 (2001) – 11i v1.5
This release of HP-UX was the first to support the new line of Itanium-based (IA-64) systems. It was not intended for mission critical computing environments and did not support HP's ServiceGuard cluster software. It provided support for running PA-RISC compiled applications on Itanium systems, and for Veritas Volume Manager 3.1.
11.22 (2002) – 11i v1.6
An incremental release of the Itanium version of HP-UX. This version achieved 64-way scalability, m:n threads, added more dynamic kernel tunable parameters, and supported HP's Logical Volume Manager on Itanium. It was built from the 11i v1 source code stream.
11.23 (2003) – 11i v2
The original release of this version was in September 2003 to support the Itanium-based systems. In September 2004 the OS was updated to provide support for both Itanium and PA-RISC systems. Besides running on Itanium systems, this release includes support for ccNUMA, web-based kernel and device configuration, IPv6, and stronger random number generation.
11.31 (2007) – 11i v3
This release supports both PA-RISC and Itanium. It was released on February 15, 2007. Major new features include native multipathing support, a unified file cache, NFSv4, Veritas ClusterFS, multi-volume VxFS, and integrated virtualization. Hyperthreading is supported on Itanium systems with Montecito and Tukwila processors. HP-UX 11i v3 conforms to The Open Group's UNIX 03 standard. Updates for 11i v3 were released once a year, with the final update, 2505.11iv3, released in May 2025.

== HP-UX 11i operating environments ==
HP bundles HP-UX 11i with programs in packages they call Operating Environments (OEs).

The following lists the currently available HP-UX 11i v3 OEs:

HP-UX 11i v3 Base OE (BOE)
Includes the full HP-UX 11i operating system plus file system and partitioning software and applications for Web serving, system management and security. BOE includes all the software formerly in FOE & TCOE (see below), plus software formerly sold stand-alone (e.g. Auto Port Aggregator).

HP-UX 11i v3 Virtualization Server OE (VSE-OE)
Includes everything in BOE plus GlancePlus performance analysis and software mirroring, and all Virtual Server Environment software which includes virtual partitions, virtual machines, workload management, capacity advisor and applications. VSE-OE includes all the software formerly in EOE (see below), plus additional virtualization software.

HP-UX 11i v3 High Availability OE (HA-OE)
Includes everything in BOE plus HP Serviceguard clustering software for system failover and tools to manage clusters, as well as GlancePlus performance analysis and software mirroring applications.

HP-UX 11i v3 Data Center OE (DC-OE)
Includes everything in one package, combining the HP-UX 11i operating system with virtualization. Everything in the HA-OE and VSE-OE is in the DC-OE. Solutions for wide-area disaster recovery and the compiler bundle are sold separately.

HP-UX 11i v2 (11.23)
HP dropped support for v2 in December 2010. Currently available HP-UX 11i v2 OEs include:

HP-UX 11i v2 Foundation OE (FOE)
Designed for Web servers, content servers and front-end servers, this OE includes applications such as HP-UX Web Server Suite, Java, and Mozilla Application Suite. This OE is bundled as HP-UX 11i FOE.
HP-UX 11i v2 Enterprise OE (EOE)
Designed for database application servers and logic servers, this OE contains the HP-UX 11i v2 Foundation OE bundles and additional applications such as GlancePlus Pak to enable an enterprise-level server. This OE is bundled as HP-UX 11i EOE.
HP-UX 11i v2 Mission Critical OE (MCOE)
Designed for the large, powerful back-end application servers and database servers that access customer files and handle transaction processing, this OE contains the Enterprise OE bundles, plus applications such as MC/ServiceGuard and Workload Manager to enable a mission-critical server. This OE is bundled as HP-UX 11i MCOE.
HP-UX 11i v2 Minimal Technical OE (MTOE)
Designed for workstations running HP-UX 11i v2, this OE includes the Mozilla Application Suite, Perl, VxVM, and Judy applications, plus the OpenGL Graphics Developer's Kit. This OE is bundled as HP-UX 11i MTOE.
HP-UX 11i v2 Technical Computing OE (TCOE)
Designed for both compute-intensive workstation and server applications, this OE contains the MTOE bundles plus extensive graphics applications, MPI and Math Libraries. This OE is bundled as HP-UX 11i-TCOE.

HP-UX 11i v1 (11.11)
According to HP's roadmap, was sold through December 2009, and supported until December 2015.

== See also ==
- HP Roman-8 (character set)
