= HPE Superdome =

Series of server computers

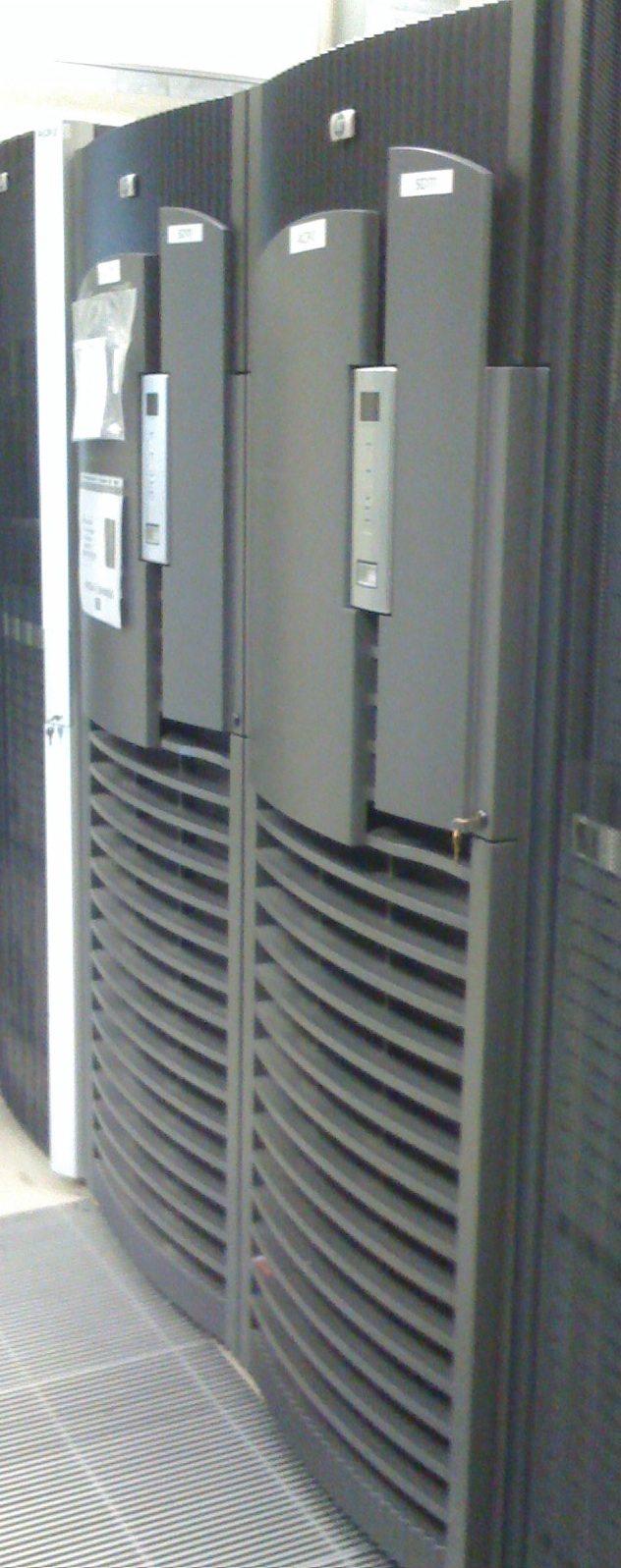
HP Integrity Superdome, or the "black" one

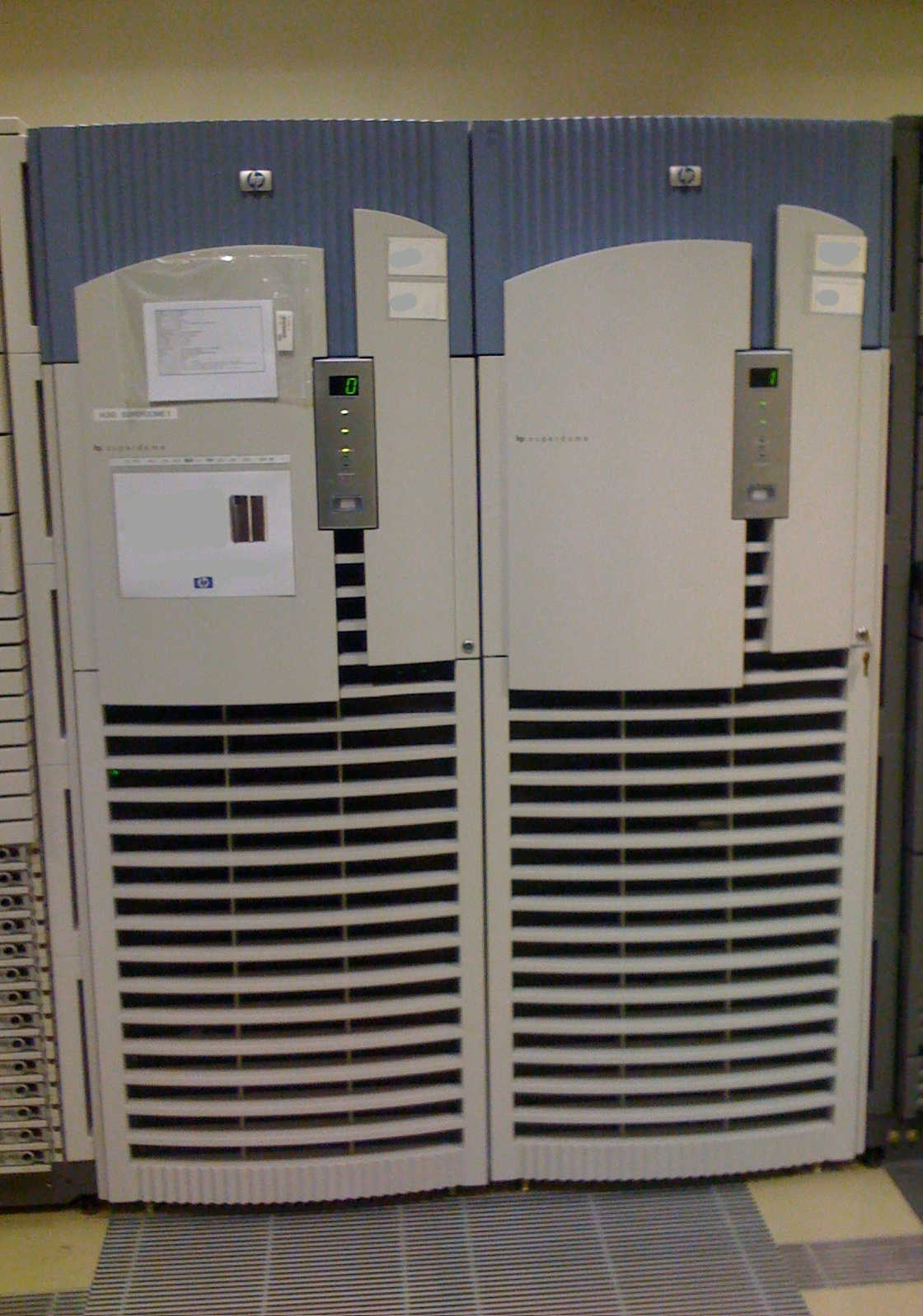
Superdome PA-RISC, or the "white" one

The HPE Superdome is a high-end server computer designed and manufactured by Hewlett Packard Enterprise (formerly Hewlett-Packard). The product's most recent version, "Superdome 2," was released in 2010 supporting 2 to 32 sockets (up to 128 cores) and 4 TB of memory. The Superdome used PA-RISC processors when it debuted in 2000. Since 2002, a second version of the machine based on Itanium 2 processors has been marketed as the HP Integrity Superdome.

The classic PA-RISC Superdome was later renamed HP 9000 Superdome. The HP V-Class was the Superdome's predecessor (which was based on a design acquired from Convex).

The HP Integrity Superdome 2 uses the Intel Itanium 93xx-series microprocessor, known as "Tukwila", and is redesigned with parts from the HP BladeSystem C7000 enclosure.

Since 2012, Intel Itanium 95xx microprocessor Poulson became available. In 2017, Intel announced that their most recent Itanium chip (code-named Kittson) would be their last Itanium update.

In 2016, Hewlett Packard Enterprise released the Superdome X, which is based on Intel Xeon processors, supporting 16 CPU sockets and 24 TB of memory.

Superdome usually runs the HP-UX operating system, although the Itanium 2 version is also compatible with other systems, for example with Microsoft Windows Server 2008 R2, SUSE Linux Enterprise Server 11 SP4, Red Hat Enterprise Linux, Debian Wheezy (Long Term Support for it has ended), and OpenVMS V8.2-1.

== Differences ==
There are 4 different generations of the Superdome:

- Legacy (Only PA-RISC cells)
- SX1000 (Can mix both Itanium and PA-RISC cells, but not in the same partition)
- SX2000 (Can mix both Itanium and PA-RISC cells, but not in the same partition)
- SX3000 (Blade based with only Itanium 93xx-series blades)

== Architecture (SX1000 version) ==
A building block is a cell, a card holding 4 processors and memory. Superdome has a ccNUMA architecture, which means that processors have shorter access times for their cell's memory but longer access times for other cell's memories, and data items are allowed to be replicated across individual cache memories but are kept coherent with one another by cache coherence hardware mechanisms. In this case, a directory-based coherency mechanism is employed.

A center of each cell is an ASIC called cell controller (CC), that connects to four processor sockets (providing an average of 1.6 GB/s of bandwidth per socket), to four local memory subsystems, and to the backplane. The CC itself contains a crossbar, and four CCs interconnect via a second-level crossbar. In the maximum machine configuration, four second-level crossbars interconnect with each other, supporting in total 64 processor sockets.

Each socket may hold either a single-core PA-RISC processor (PA-8600 or PA-8700), or a dual-core PA-RISC processor (PA-8800 or PA-8900), a single-core Itanium 2 processor, two Itanium 2 processors (using the mx2 module), or one dual-core Itanium 2 processor. There are almost no architectural differences between PA-RISC and Itanium versions of Superdome.

=== Physical layout ===
Superdome is not mounted on a standard rack, it is instead shipped as either one or two dedicated cabinets. One cabinet scales to 8 cells, two cabinets at most (16 cells, 16 I/O cages, 192 PCI-X slots). Connection of more than two cabinets was planned, but not implemented.

=== Input/output ===
Each CC connects to one local I/O controller (an SBA), which in turn may connect at most to a single I/O card cage (also called I/O chassis) with 12 PCI-X slots. A maximum of 192 slots are possible for the Legacy and SX1000 (16 cells, 16 I/O cages). It is not possible to expand the number of I/O slots for a cell, so if an nPar needs more I/O slots, another cell must be added.

Superdome does not contain any internal hard disks, it relies exclusively on external disk enclosures.

=== Partitioning ===
Superdome supports nPars (hard partitions), that are granular on the level of a whole cell (and its I/O card cage). This means that a maximum of 16 cells can be part of an nPar.

The Superdome also supports vPars (virtual partitions), granular on a single core level and a single PCI slot level. This means that a top level nPar can house several vPars to better use the hardware in the Superdome.

== Architecture (SX2000 version) ==
The architecture of the SX2000 is similar at first glance compared to the SX1000, however it has design differences.

- The hardware clock has been moved from the power-board to the backplane and doubled for redundancy and greater quality.
- The SX2000 introduced PCI-Express card cages (retaining support for PCI-X 2.0). A maximum of 192 external slots are possible.
- All connections have been changed to high speed serial (HSS) connections for greater speed and greater redundancy.
- Three crossbars compared to two crossbars in each quadrant (per four cells) provide greater speed.

Similarly to both Legacy and SX1000 setups, SX2000 can be:

- 16-way (four cellboards and two IO-cages can be used)
- 32-way (eight cellboards and four IO-cages can be used)
- 64-way (expands the one cabinet to two-cabinet complex, with 16 cells and eight IO-cages)

== Architecture (SX3000 version) ==
The currently available options for SX3000 are:

- 8s (maximum 8 blades, max 4 blades per partition)
- 16s (maximum 8 blades, max 8 blades per partition)
- 32s starter (maximum 16 blades, max 16 blades per partition, shipped as double 16s enclosures that can be configured as a SX3000 32s using the starter package upgrade kit)
- 32s (maximum 16 blades, max 16 blades per partition)

For the SX3000 there are four integrated 10 Gbit Ethernet per blade. In addition, a maximum of 96 external PCI-e ports are available. It is unsupported to install any mezzanine cards, although three free slots exist on each blade.
